= Tax-free shopping =

Sales tax refund

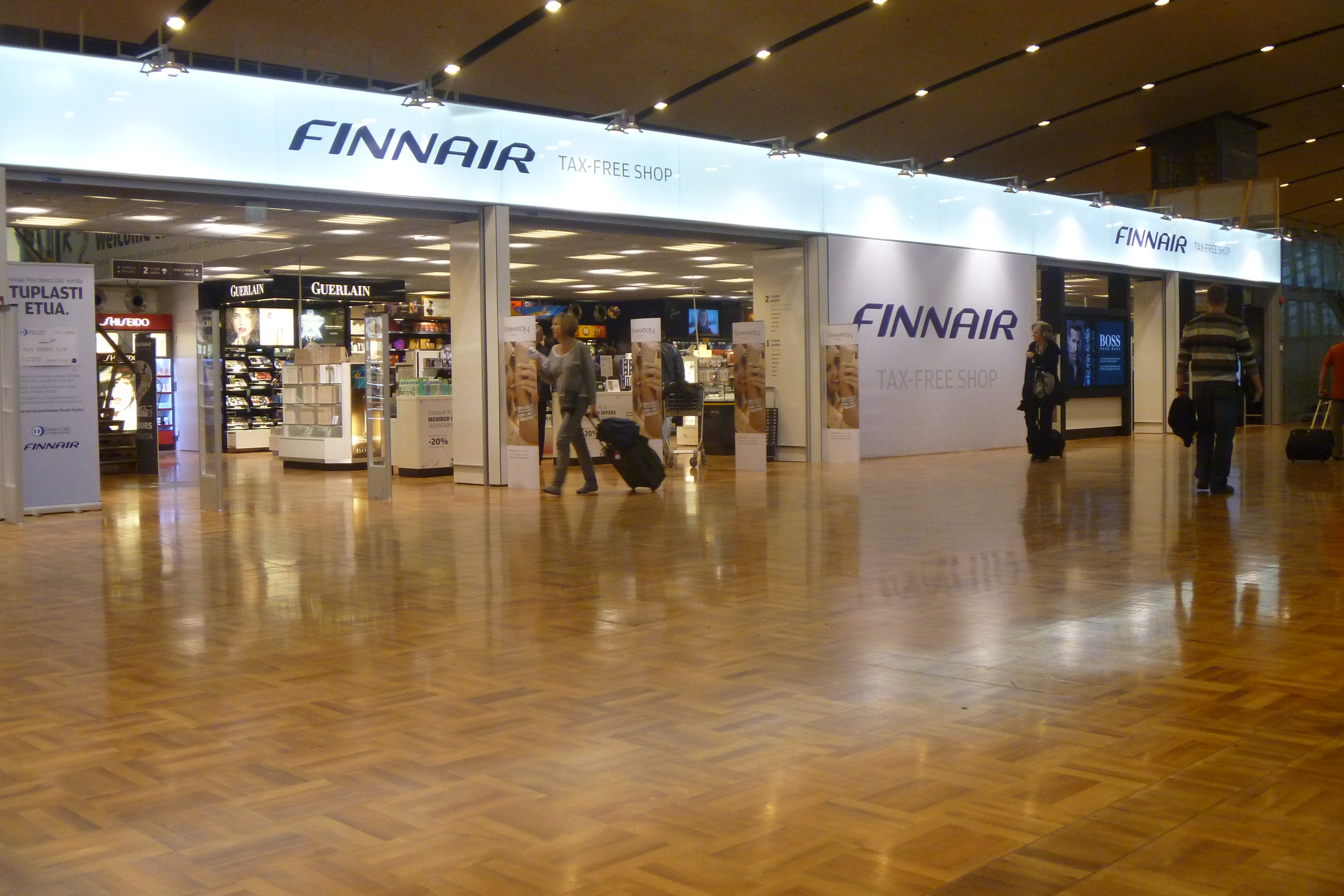
A tax-free shopping retailer

Tax-free shopping (TFS) is the buying of goods in another country or state and obtaining a refund of the sales tax which has been collected by the retailer on those goods. The sales tax may be variously described as a sales tax, goods and services tax (GST), value added tax (VAT), or consumption tax.

Promoting tax-free shopping and making it easier for tourists to claim the refund back has helped to attract travellers to many countries. TFS is subject to national regulations, such as minimum spend and restrictions on the types of products on which it can be claimed. Refunds can only be claimed on goods which are exported. Buying goods tax free does not mean travellers are exempt from paying applicable taxes on their purchases when they get home; however, they will generally be able to benefit from an allowance of a certain amount on import.

== Tax-free shopping countries ==
Fifty-four of the 130 countries that levy VAT/GST allow foreign visitors to have their taxes reimbursed.

Tax-free shopping is currently available in the following countries: Argentina, Armenia, Australia, Austria, Azerbaijan, Belgium, Bulgaria, China, Colombia, Croatia, Cyprus, Czech Republic, Denmark, Estonia, Finland, France, Germany, Guernsey, Greece, Hungary, Iceland, Indonesia, Ireland, Israel, Italy, Japan, Korea, Latvia, Lebanon, Liechtenstein, Lithuania, Luxembourg, North Macedonia, Malaysia, Mexico, Morocco, the Netherlands, Norway, Poland, Portugal, Romania, Russia, Serbia, Singapore, Slovenia, Slovakia, Spain, South Africa, Sweden, Switzerland, Taiwan, Thailand, Turkey, Vietnam and Uzbekistan.

== Refund ==
The refunded amount corresponds to the VAT or GST paid and in which country the traveller buys goods. VAT/GST is a tax added to the cost of a product, calculated as a percentage of the products retail price. Often in Europe, the ticket price includes VAT, this is less often the case in the US. As an example, if the VAT rate on a product is 20% and the ticket price is displayed as €100, including VAT, the VAT will be €16.67 (83.33 + 20% VAT = €100.).A handling fee may be charged by and can vary between service providers.

== National policies ==
=== Europe ===
Travellers resident in a country outside the EU, can shop tax-free at shops outside EU airports. The traveller pays the VAT over goods in the shop and can request a refund when leaving the European Union with the goods. General restrictions are that a traveller must be a resident in a non-EU country, has a maximum stay of 6 months when visiting the EU, purchases are made up to three months prior to export, and only goods meant for personal use are eligible for the refund. Travellers need to keep the purchase receipts and visit Customs before leaving the EU to get an export validation stamp. Receipts can then be sent back to the retailers for a refund request.

Each country has a different VAT rate which is reclaimable, and most have a minimum purchase amount restriction however there are exceptions.

VAT Rates and Minimum Purchases Required to Qualify for Refunds
Country of Purchase	VAT Standard Rate*	Minimum in Local Currency
Austria	20%	€75.01
Belgium	21%	€125.01
Bulgaria	20%	250 BGN
Croatia	25%	740 HRK
Czech Republic	21%	2,001 CZK
Denmark	25%	300 DKK
Estonia	20%	€38.01
Finland	25.5%	€40
France	20%	€100.01
Germany	19%	€50
Greece	24%	€50
Hungary	27%	54,001 HUF
Iceland	24%	6,000 ISK
Ireland	21%	€30
Italy	22%	€70
Latvia	21%	€44
Lithuania	21%	€55
Luxembourg	17%	€74
Malta	18%	€100
Netherlands	21%	€50
Norway	25%	315 NOK
Poland	23%	200 PLN
Portugal	23%	€61.35
Romania	19%	250 RON
Slovakia	20%	€100
Slovenia	22%	€50.01
Spain	21%	€0
Sweden	25%	200 SEK
Switzerland	8%	300 CHF
Turkey	18%	₺118
Uzbekistan	12%	1 000 000 sum

The United Kingdom (except Northern Ireland) closed its VAT refund scheme at the end of 2020, though VAT-free shopping is still available where a retailer ships goods out of the country at the time of purchase.

=== United States ===
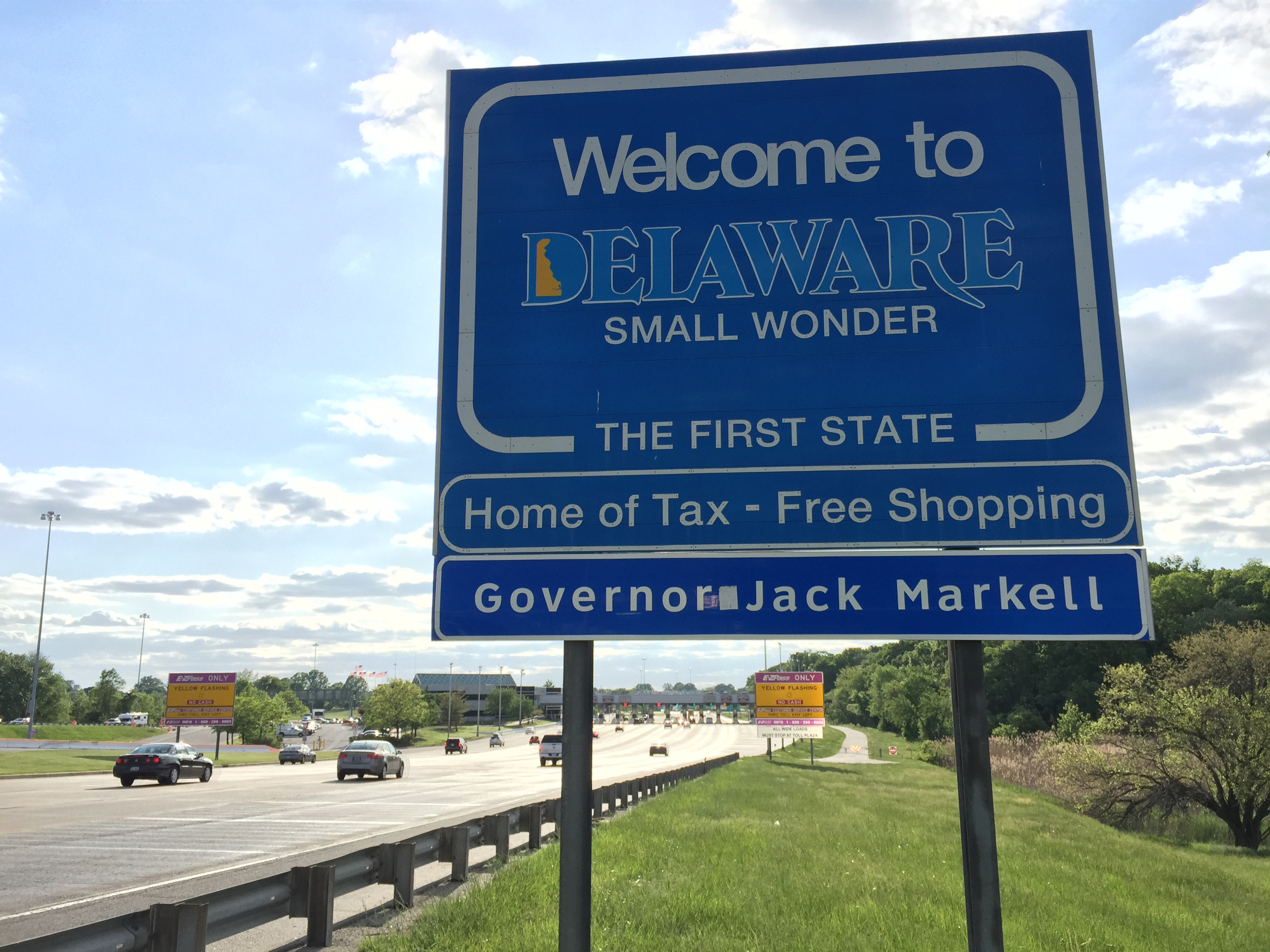
Delaware proclaims to be the "Home of Tax-Free Shopping" as the state does not have a sales tax

Some jurisdictions in the United States allow a refund of sales tax to foreign tourists upon leaving the country.

Tax-free shopping is a privilege enjoyed by all residents of United States jurisdictions without sales taxes, but through so-called "remote" sales—including sales to visiting out-of-state residents, sales via catalog, and sales via Internet—customers in a sales taxed jurisdiction may also make purchases in sales tax-free jurisdictions, notwithstanding the legal requirement to pay the equivalent (compensatory) use tax in their home state. Delaware is free of all sales taxes, excluding homes and cars (3% transfer tax for real estate, and a 2.75% tag fee for cars). The Christiana Mall near Newark, Delaware attracts shoppers from the nearby states of Maryland, New Jersey, New York, and Pennsylvania looking to save money on purchases from not having to pay sales tax. The Apple Store at the Christiana Mall claims to sell more iPhones than any other location in the chain due to Delaware's lack of sales tax. Merchants in tax-free New Hampshire regularly advertise to residents of adjacent Massachusetts, Vermont, and Maine the benefits of purchasing goods without sales tax, ignoring the fact that there is no general exemption from the use taxes when the goods are taken back home. Many purchasers are unaware of the obligation to pay the tax, or file the necessary return, or of the fact that it is not the duty of a merchant to collect it from them and pay it indirectly. However, it is the purchaser's obligation to pay it directly to the state, often in connection with filing their annual income tax return.

The liability of any non-exempt resident of a US state with a sales tax for payment of the equivalent use tax when purchasing goods from another state (or country) through mail-order, by telephone or through the Internet should not be confused with the issue of direct Internet taxes levied on Internet services themselves, such as bit taxes, bandwidth taxes, franchise taxes, and email taxes. Most such levies are banned until 2014 by the Internet Tax Freedom Act Amendment Acts of 2007 which extends the provisions in the federal Internet Tax Freedom Act beyond its original 2007 expiration.

Goods that would be taxable at home are taxable at the same rate when taken home or delivered, regardless of where or how they were purchased. Numerous local sales tax and use tax exemptions exist according to taxpayer status (for example, there exist exemptions for charitable organizations), exemptions based on size of purchase (e.g., clothing under $110 in Vermont), and exemptions for specific types of goods (e.g., protective clothing, food, medication, and educational materials).

Even customers from jurisdictions that levy sales taxes can in theory have additional tax liabilities when shopping in neighboring no-tax or lower-tax jurisdictions. For example, if an adjacent state has a slightly lower tax rate than the purchaser's home, that shopper could face an additional tax burden even though the purchase was already taxed at the point of sale. The difference in tax rates is referred to by collecting authorities as "tax discount".

Taxing jurisdictions generally extend an exemption from use tax to commercial taxpayers that purchase business stock. This type of exemption applies to goods purchased tax-free for resale, but lapses if the goods are converted to use by the company itself (for example, a company car, office supplies, and cleaning supplies).

Some countries charge a value added tax (VAT) or goods and services tax (GST) that extends to retail purchases. When those customers are residents of a US state having sales taxes on such goods, the VAT or GST taxes paid might be used as a credit against the amount of use tax otherwise owed, unless excluded, such as in Massachusetts. However, when a post-travel refund of the VAT or GST is claimed, the purchaser's home taxing jurisdiction can then assert a claim for the full sales tax liability.

Despite the fact that most shoppers are unaware of their use tax obligations, there are potentially severe penalties for willful tax evasion. Any online, telephone mail-order, or traveling shopper who makes "tax free" purchases could be successfully prosecuted for evading state use taxes if he or she willfully fails to file the necessary return and pay the required tax, or intentionally omits the information from a required annual return. When a taxing jurisdiction enforces use tax liability, it often also seeks additional penalties and interest accrued for failure to timely remit the necessary tax return and tax payments, as well as possible perjury for omissions on official forms filed. The statute of limitations on taxes due may not begin to run until and unless a required tax return is filed. Some states also provide a "safe harbor" scale of use tax that is most likely owed by every taxpayer, based upon the taxpayer's adjusted gross income. For example, someone with an income of over $100,000 could earmark 0.0005 of his or income as payment for "use tax", without having to account for any actual out-of-state purchases under $1,000 each.

To step up the opportunity for collection of use taxes, several US states have been working to implement a "streamlined" interstate use tax agreement. To effectuate this multilateral interstate compact, many states have enacted, or are considering enacting, statutory changes that require residents to disclose, under penalty of perjury, their annual use tax liability for out-of-state purchases. The focus on use tax collection has increased because the U.S. Supreme Court has previously placed significant hurdles in the path of state efforts to collect sales taxes on transactions in other no-tax or lower-tax jurisdictions. In National Bellas Hess, Inc. v. Department of Revenue of the State of Illinois and Quill Corp. v. North Dakota, the Court concluded that the Commerce Clause and Due Process Clause of the U.S. Constitution require that there be a nexus between the taxing state and the vendor of goods or services, in the form of a physical presence. (These court cases were later overruled in South Dakota v. Wayfair, Inc. (2018), which stated that a state may collect sales tax on purchases made from out-of-state sellers that do not have a physical presence in the state.) This has been interpreted to apply to both catalog sales and out of state sales over the Internet. States were thus previously prohibited from collecting sales taxes on so-called remote transactions because to do so would unconstitutionally burden interstate commerce.

The Streamlined Sales Tax Project is the states' response, by which they are seeking to collect use taxes on remote Internet and catalog sales in lieu of sales taxes. In connection with it, there has been discussion among state tax officials of creating obligations or incentives for merchants to collect taxes from customers who are residents of sales tax states, especially in the area of online sales, in exchange for a remitting to the merchant a percentage of the taxes that would be otherwise unpaid. Some US states are also considering a tax amnesty, pursuant to which residents could settle unpaid use taxes and penalties at a discount, but only if the settlement is offered before collection of the tax liability commences.

=== Australia ===
In Australia tax-free shopping is called the Tourist Refund Scheme (TRS) which allows overseas visitors and Australian residents to claim a refund of the Goods and Services Tax (GST) and Wine equalisation tax (WET) paid on certain goods bought in Australia within 60 days of leaving Australia, and then taken out of Australia in carry-on bags or worn. The refund is available on goods purchased in the 60 days before leaving Australia, purchases from any single business (even on separate invoices) must total $300 (GST inclusive) or more, the traveller must have an original tax invoice for the goods, the goods may require to be verified by an officer at the Customs and Border Protection Client Services counter.

Claims for a tax refund can be made at the TRS counter in an international airport or the cruiseliner terminal of some Australian seaports.

== See also ==
- Duty-free
- Internet taxes
- Internet Tax Nondiscrimination Act
- Sales taxes in the United States
- Tax holiday
- Use tax
