= Marketplace Fairness Act =

Proposed law in the United States

Marketplace Fairness Act of 2013
- Long title: To restore States' sovereign rights to enforce State and local sales and use tax laws, and for other purposes.
- Announced in: the 113th United States Congress
- Sponsored by: Rep. Steve Womack (R, AR-3)
- Number of co-sponsors: 66

Codification
- Acts affected: "Internal Revenue Code of 1986", "Marketplace Fairness Act of 2013", "Mobile Telecommunications Sourcing Act",
- U.S.C. sections affected: 4 U.S.C. §§ 116–126

Legislative history
- Introduced in the House as H.R. 684 by Rep. Steve Womack (R, AR-3) on February 14, 2013; Committee consideration by United States House Committee on the Judiciary

The Marketplace Fairness Act was a proposed legislation pending in the United States Congress that would enable state governments to collect sales taxes and use taxes from remote retailers with no physical presence in their state.

During the 112th United States Congress, a bill (S. 1832) was considered but expired without enactment. During the 113th Congress, the Marketplace Fairness Act of 2013 was introduced on February 14, 2013, in the House as H.R. 684 and in the Senate as S. 336. It was introduced a second time in the Senate as S. 743 on April 16, 2013 and was passed there on May 6, 2013. All three bills were virtually identical and would have allowed states to require online and other out-of-state retailers to collect sales and use tax. It was re-introduced as S. 976 in 2017 but did not pass.

The Supreme Court later ruled in South Dakota v. Wayfair, Inc. that the states are not constitutionally barred from collecting sales and use tax from out-of-state retailers.

== Prior law ==
Each state in the United States may impose a sales tax on products or services sold in that state. Most states impose a sales tax, some states do not; and each state may set the rate and scope (products taxed) of the sales tax. Within each state, counties and cities may have different sales tax rates and scope, resulting in many different rates based on the location of the point of sale. Generally, the states allow (or require) the seller to itemize and collect the tax from their customers at the time of purchase. Most jurisdictions hold sellers responsible for the tax even when it is not collected at the time of purchase.

Residents of the 45 states with sales and use tax must pay tax on their online purchases. However, according to the Supreme Court rulings in National Bellas Hess v. Illinois (1967) and Quill Corp. v. North Dakota (1992), retailers, including catalog and online sellers, only need to collect sales and use tax for states where they have a physical presence. If an online retailer does not collect sales tax at the time of purchase, the consumer must pay the use tax due directly to the state. While business compliance with use tax filing is quite high, consumer compliance is rather low. The Marketplace Fairness Act sought to increase compliance and tax collections by shifting the responsibility for payment from consumers to retailers.

Quill and National Bellas Hess were later overruled in South Dakota v. Wayfair, Inc. (2018), which stated that a state may collect sales tax on purchases made from out-of-state sellers that do not have a physical presence in the state.

== Provisions of the bill ==
This summary is based largely on the summary provided by the Congressional Research Service, a public domain source.

The Marketplace Fairness Act of 2013 would authorize each member state under the Streamlined Sales and Use Tax Agreement (the multi-state agreement for the administration and collection of sales and use taxes adopted on November 12, 2002) to require all sellers not qualifying for a small-seller exception (applicable to sellers with annual gross receipts in total U.S. remote sales not exceeding $1 million) to collect and remit sales and use taxes with respect to remote sales under provisions of the agreement, but only if the agreement includes minimum simplification requirements relating to the administration of the tax, audits, and streamlined filing. The bill defines "remote sale" as a sale of goods or services into a state in which the seller would not legally be required to pay, collect, or remit state or local sales and use taxes unless provided by the act.

=== Previous versions ===
The 2011 version of the Marketplace Fairness Act (S. 1832) would have provided states with the authority to require out-of-state retailers to collect and remit use tax on purchases shipped into the state. In return, states would have been required to either join the Streamlined Sales and Use Tax Agreement or to simplify their sales and use tax laws to comply with the Marketplace Fairness Act. That bill would have required any seller who sells a product or service to a consumer in a participating state to calculate, collect, and remit the consumer's use tax based on the tax rates of that other state. The purpose was to offset use taxes that consumers evade paying in their home state when making interstate purchases. The bill specifically made no distinction as to the manner in which the sale is transacted.

The 2011 bill provided an exclusion for businesses with annual sales of $500,000 or less. This was much smaller than the threshold used by the Small Business Administration for defining a small business: $30 million in most cases. There was also no specific exclusion in the legislation to exempt resellers from the tax, so the Streamlined Sales and Use Tax Agreement would have applied to those sales: A retail shop owner who makes interstate purchases of applicable merchandise for resale in their store would be required to pay sales tax on those purchases or apply to their state for a reseller permit, resale license, or wholesale exemption certificate, any of which would exempt retailers from paying sales tax on purchases made for resale.

== History ==
In December 2014, members of the House of Representatives lobbied their leadership to allow a vote on the act. Steve Womack organized a group of 30 Republican members that met with Speaker John Boehner and Judiciary Chairman Robert Goodlatte. Boehner again refused to allow a vote in the 113th Congress. Boehner and Goodlatte did say that they were committed to eventually getting a vote "done."

In 2013 legislation, Virginia tied its gas tax rate to passage of the Marketplace Fairness Act or similar legislation by January 1, 2015. On that date Virginia automatically increased its gas tax rate by about 45% in order to partially cover the revenue shortfall from failure to pay tax on online sales shipped from out of state. The tax increase will automatically cease when federal legislation is passed to address this issue.

In the 112th Congress, the bill (S. 1832) was introduced in the United States Senate on November 9, 2011.

Multiple bills were introduced in the 113th Congress:

- S.743 was introduced into the Senate on April 16, 2013 by Senator Michael Enzi (R-WY). As of April 23, 2013, the bill had 28 cosponsors – 21 Democrats, 6 Republicans, and 1 independent.
- S.336 was introduced into the Senate on February 14, 2013 by Senator Michael Enzi (R-WY). The bill was immediately referred to the United States Senate Committee on Finance. As of April 23, 2013, the bill had 29 cosponsors – 22 Democrats, 6 Republicans, and 1 independent.
- H.R. 684 was introduced into the House on February 14, 2013 by Rep. Steve Womack (R-AR). The bill was immediately referred to the United States House Committee on the Judiciary. On April 8, 2013, it was referred to the United States House Judiciary Subcommittee on Regulatory Reform, Commercial and Antitrust Law. As of April 23, 2013, it had 55 cosponsors, 33 Democrats and 22 Republicans.

== Debate ==
=== Previous bills ===
In the 2011 Bill, opponents were concerned that the bill would have imposed an unrealistic burden on sellers and consumers, while proponents said that it would have helped retailers with a physical presence in sales-tax states to compete with online retailers. Proponents have argued that residents of states that impose a sales tax choose to purchase out-of-state products to avoid the sales tax and that businesses selling to customers in participating sales-tax states should collect and pay the new interstate sales tax, to mitigate the effect of consumers who illegally evade the use tax. Opponents of the bill argued that states already have the right to impose, or not impose, a sales tax, and if states wished to compete for interstate sales, they may reduce or eliminate their sales tax.

Large retailers who have a physical presence in most or all states are already required to collect sales tax on interstate sales to consumers in those states, so the bill would not have had a significant effect on them. (Technically, those sales are considered intrastate sales for taxing purposes because of the seller's physical presence within the taxing state.) Prior to the South Dakota v. Wayfair, Inc. decision, their smaller competitors who have stores in a few states or in one state were required to collect sales tax only where they have a physical location. If they have online stores, the bill would have allowed participating states to require them to calculate, collect, and pay the new interstate sales tax. Walmart, Target, Amazon, and other retailers have been reported as supporters of a new sales tax. The National Association of Music Merchants supported the 2011 Bill because it would have required online music sellers such as Apple's iTunes to pay the tax to some participating states. eBay, Overstock.com, and other online retailers were opponents of the 2011 Bill. Retailers and government representatives in states that have no sales tax were generally opposed to the bill.

=== Supporters ===
The Alliance for Main Street Fairness (AMSF), is a coalition of business owners and citizens from across the United States who want to level the playing field and fix antiquated tax laws so that businesses, whether online or traditional brick-and-mortar sellers, can compete fairly in the marketplace.

The Retail Industry Leaders Association (RILA), a trade association in the retail industry, spoke out in favor of the Marketplace Fairness Act of 2013. In a press release, the organization argued that the bill would "level the playing field" between online-only retailers and Main Street businesses by giving the States the option to charge sales tax. Walmart and Amazon.com have teamed up in a massive lobbying effort in support of this legislation. Other big backers of the legislation include many of the nation's largest "box store" retailers including Best Buy, Bed Bath and Beyond, Barnes & Noble, Dick's Sporting Goods, Foot Locker, Target, Staples. In fact, the nation's biggest retailers spent over $50 million lobbying the Senate before its passage of the MFA on May 6, 2013.

President Barack Obama indicated his support for the bill with a White House Statement of Administrative Policy on April 22, 2013. In the statement, the White House expresses the concern that small local businesses are disadvantaged because they collect state sales tax in comparison to large online retailers who do not.

Governors from across the U.S. have also come out in support of federal legislation allowing states to collect a sales tax from purchases made online. Nearly fifteen state Governors have either signed legislation or are considering legislation while pledging to cut taxes for their citizens using the new revenues once Congress passes federal legislation. Conservative leaders and elected officials have also come out in large to support federal legislation to level the playing field for brick-and-mortar retailers.

Arthur B. Laffer, Chairman, Laffer Associates: "In-state retailers collect sales taxes at the time of purchase. When residents purchase from retailers out of state (including over the Internet) they are supposed to report these purchases and pay the sales taxes owed—which are typically referred to as a "use tax." As you can imagine, few people do. The result is to narrow a state's sales-tax base. It also leads to several inefficiencies that, on net, diminish potential job and economic growth. Exempting Internet purchases from the sales tax naturally encourages consumers to buy goods over the Web; worse, the exemption incentivizes consumers to use in-state retailers as a showroom before they do so. This increases in-state retailers' overall costs and reduces their overall productivity."

Charles Krauthammer, Columnist and Political Commentator: "The real issue here is the fairness argument – that if you're an old fashioned store, you have to have your customers and you pay the sales tax and online you don't. Which, I mean, you're already at a disadvantage if you're an old fashioned store: you have to have, you have to cover rent, you have to cover insurance and all that. So I think you want to have something that will level the playing field. You can do it one of two ways. You abolish all sales taxes for real stores and nobody pays. Or you get the Internet people to pay the sales tax as well. I think the second one is the only way to do it, obviously."

Americans for Limited Government: "The Goodlatte and Chaffetz hearing hopefully helped separate the wheat from the chaff on this basic fairness issue moving the ball toward states being allowed to decide for themselves if they want to collect out-of-state sales tax or not. For anyone who favors local control over issues related to taxation, then moving control over this issue from D.C. to the states is the right choice."

Maine Governor Paul LePage: "Last week, Gov. Paul LePage, R-Maine, wrote his state's two U.S. senators, Republicans Susan Collins and Olympia Snowe, to urge them to back legislation introduced by Sens. Mike Enzi, R-Wyo., Dick Durbin, D-Ill., and Lamar Alexander, R-Tenn., that would close a loophole left by a 1992 Supreme Court decision. The high court ruled that states can't require retailers such as catalog and now online retailers to collect sales taxes from customers in states where those companies have no physical presence. 'There's no denying that passing the bill would give thousands of small Maine businesses a real boost,' LePage wrote. 'Through no fault of their own, federal policy now gives some out-of-state corporations an unfair advantage over other Maine retailers.'"

Colin A. Hanna, President, Let Freedom Ring: "By tacitly permitting most online retailers not to collect sales taxes the same way that brick-and-mortar retailers do, the federal government is in essence providing a government-created competitive advantage to a class of online e-tailers over the traditional retailers who are the backbone of American small business… Current law on Internet retail sales does not promote transparency; instead it countenances a hidden subsidy to a certain kind of business. To support this is not a conservative position and actually undermines one of conservatism's cardinal principles: the rule of law."

Indiana Governor and former Representative Mike Pence: "I don't think Congress should be in the business of picking winners and losers. Inaction by Congress today results in a system today that does pick winners and losers."

Christopher Caldwell, Senior Editor, The Weekly Standard: "California governor Jerry Brown killed two birds with one stone last month when he signed a law that would require internet retailers to collect the state's 7.25 per cent sales tax. He was raising needed revenue. And he was addressing a great injustice of the information age. State and federal legislators made a big mistake when they exempted e-commerce from taxes in the 1990s. They were giddy with the rhetoric of cyberanarchism and inspired by anti-tax yahoos convinced raising revenue is an optional part of running a government. The kindest thing one can say about the policy is that it constituted an overgenerous subsidy to an infant industry."

Al Cardenas, Chairman, American Conservative Union (ACU): "A robust free-market system requires a level playing field, where the government doesn't get to pick winners and losers in the marketplace. Senator Enzi and Congressman Womack deserve praise for their efforts to empower states to make their own revenue policy choices and create a fair system of tax collection. The number one threat to the future of American competitiveness isn't other countries-- it's our tax law. When it comes to state sales taxes, it is time to address the area where federally mandated prejudice is most egregious — the policy towards Internet sales, the decades-old inequity between online sales and in-person sales as outdated and unfair."

Representative Paul Ryan (R-WI-1): "To me, I think the concept is right… It's only fair that the local brick-and-mortar retailer be treated the same as the big-box online sales company out of state."

Ned Ryun, President and Founder of American Majority: "One of the basic principles of the conservative movement is that the market, not the government, should pick economic winners and losers. The only role that government should play is to ensure a fair and level playing field. When it comes to sales taxes, that principle has gone out the window in the Internet age… The tax discrimination in favor of online sales is unfortunately another example of a federal government that has lost its way by clinging to its power. Under federalism and the 10th Amendment, powers not vested in the federal government are retained by the states... Decisions that can be made by governors and state legislatures—who are close to the people and thus responsive to citizens' needs—should be left at the state level. That is the heart of true federalism.

Stephen DeMaura, President of Americans for Job Security: "The Marketplace Fairness Act is a workable solution that finally levels the playing field for small businesses and empowers states to collect the taxes that are already owed. For states like Montana, New Hampshire, Delaware, and Oregon that currently have no sales tax, nothing will change. For those that do have a sales tax, states will merely be empowered to have online retailers collect the existing sales tax from consumers at the time of purchase, like our local retailers do. Most importantly, the Marketplace Fairness Act makes these reforms in a way that puts the ultimate taxpayer first, protecting individuals, empowering consumers, and encouraging economic growth."

Curtis Riskey, Executive Director, CBA, The Association for Christian Retail: "Unfortunately, due to a loophole caused by the 1992 Quill Supreme Court decision, our independent Christian retailers are put at disadvantage because Internet-only companies are not required to collect sales taxes. This unlevel playing field has resulted in staffing reductions and the closing of many of our independent Christian retailers over the past few years, threatening the very existence of our membership and their ability to serve our Christian communities… As the saying goes, a sale, is a sale, is a sale, and our sales tax collection policies should be the same regardless if an item was purchased online or through one of our members' store fronts. Local independent businesses are a more important economic generator for our communities than out-of-state businesses seeking tax avoidance."

New Jersey Governor Chris Christie: Governor Chris Christie: "I just want to make clear that I have been working on this issue in my role on the executive committee of the National Governors Association because it is an important issue to all the nation's governors. And I too – along with governors like Governor Daniels and others – urge the federal government and the Congress in particular to get behind Senator Lamar Alexander's legislation to allow states to be able to make these choices for themselves. And I think Senator Alexander's legislation would be a great step forward in that regard. It would give states options to decide how they want to deal with this and not have to any longer deal with the federal prohibition on dealing with it. So, it would allow us to do it in a much more uniform and broader way. So, I'm with Governor Daniels on this and other Republican governors – Governor Snyder of Michigan and others who feel strongly about it. And we've been working on it at the National Governors Association and I know we will continue to and hope to get some type of resolution to it by the end of this year."

Michigan Governor Rick Snyder: 'Technology currently exists to quickly and effectively calculate taxes due on sales and can be easily be integrated into online retailers' operations,' wrote Snyder, a onetime venture capitalist and former executive at the computer company Gateway. 'It is time for Congress to grant states the authority to enforce sales tax and use laws on all retailers doing business in their state.'

Alabama Governor Robert Bentley: "Alabama's Republican governor has urged lawmakers from his state to support online sales tax legislation, adding to the growing roster of GOP officials who are on board with the idea. Gov. Robert Bentley told Alabama's two senators and seven House members the online sales tax bills would improve the state's fiscal situation, and stressed that the legislation would not create a new tax. 'The bills will give Alabama the authority to collect sales taxes – as we currently do from local brick-and-mortar retailers – that are already owed from online retailers,' Bentley wrote in a letter dated April 19. 'Allowing us to effectively close this sales tax loophole would help both our state's finances and our state's small businesses.'"

Utah Governor Gary Herbert: "On March 24, 2012, Utah Governor Gary Herbert signed into law an affiliate nexus bill that will require certain remote sellers to collect and remit Utah sales tax, effective July 1, 2012. An out-of-state seller will be considered to have nexus in Utah if the seller holds a substantial ownership interest in, or is owned in whole or in substantial part, by a related seller, and the seller sells the same or a substantially similar line of products as the related seller and does so under the same or a substantially similar business name, or the place of business of the related seller or an in-state employee of the related seller is used to advertise, promote, or facilitate sales by the seller to the purchaser."

Idaho Governor C.L. "Butch" Otter: "Gov. C.L. 'Butch' Otter backs taxing Internet sales to level the playing field between virtual businesses and brick-and-mortar establishments on Idaho's Main Street. Otter made the remarks to Idaho chamber of commerce leaders meeting in Boise on Monday."

Georgia Governor Nathan Deal: "Gov. Nathan Deal is considering extending the state sales tax to online purchases, he told newspaper publishers Thursday morning … 'In the absence of congressional activity on that … I think there will be some appetite to act on that in the legislature,' he said."

=== Opponents ===
There was mounting opposition in the House of Representatives for the legislation as well as generational divide. Key opponents in the House include Reps. Thomas Massie (R-KY), Ron DeSantis (R-FL) and John Fleming (R-LA).

In the Senate, the bill received stiff opposition from the states that do not have sales tax, which are Alaska, Oregon, New Hampshire, Montana and Delaware as well as key senators Ted Cruz and Rand Paul. Every single Republican under the age of 50 voted against the bill in the Senate. After the bill passed the Senate, Attorneys General of Montana, Tim Fox, Alaska – Michael Geraghty, and Oregon Ellen Rosenblum have come out in strong opposition to the bill. They feel strongly that it violates the constitution of the United States by authorizing the enforcement of state use tax laws that require remote sales retailers to collect and remit use tax proceeds to out-of-state taxing authorities that the retailer has not established "minimum contacts" with, the Act violates the Due Process Clause.

The Competitive Enterprise Institute (CEI), a non-profit think tank, criticized the Marketplace Fairness Act of 2013. The group raised concerns that the bill undermined States sovereignty by giving states the ability to level taxes beyond their own borders; that the bill damages consumer privacy by forcing retailers to turn over customer data to state governments; that the bill hurts healthy tax competition between states; and that the bill faces legal issues regarding due process.

NetChoice, a trade association of e-commerce businesses has long opposed MFA as it creates a new tax burden on businesses. NetChoice has warned that MFA would impede new startups and help the big-box stores crush main street. Testifying before the House Judiciary committee in March, NetChoice proposed a simple alternative.

The National Taxpayers Union (NTU) also spoke out strongly against S.743, urging their organization's supporters to contact their Senators and encourage them to vote against it. The organization announced that they would be using the way a Senator voted on the measure as one of their most heavily weighted votes when rating the Senators for the year. NTU opposed the bill because it would hurt tax competition between states and would "heap heavy burdens upon small businesses, which would face the task of collecting and remitting to nearly 10,000 taxing jurisdictions".

The Heritage Foundation criticized the bill because it believes the bill would harm Internet commerce and small businesses.

The True Simplification of Taxation Coalition (TruST), represents both e-commerce and catalog businesses that believe that they and their customers will be unduly harmed by this legislation unless there is much greater simplification and standardization across the states than is in the current version of the legislation. TruST argues that the playing field is already level and provides a list of minimum simplification requirements. Among the minimum simplification requirements are: a) a single set of definitions for taxable and exempt products for all states; b) a single audit on behalf of all states and local jurisdictions conducted by a single state where the seller has physical nexus, or a designated state in cases where a seller lacks physical nexus in any sales tax state; and c) a common sales tax return for remote sellers to file. The audit risk is also cited as a principal concern of the E Mainstreet Alliance, a group of small businesses, some of which are online only but many of which also have a brick and mortar presence, who are worried about being crippled by this legislation.

Members of the American Catalog Mailers Association (ACMA), say that the impact on catalog companies and their customers has largely been ignored as the press continues to report on this issue as an "online" tax. Millions of consumers who order by mail, especially senior citizens, may be disenfranchised.

WE R HERE, a self-described coalition of small businesses, issued a press release against S.743 stating that, "worse yet, Internet Sales Tax proposals currently being considered contain definitions of small business entirely out of step with commonly accepted definitions. The Small Business Administration defines a small business in this industry as $30 million in annual revenue. The Internal Revenue Service defines a small business at $20 million in annual revenue. The Marketplace Fairness Act arbitrarily defines a small business as having $1 million in revenue." The Small Business Administration definitions can be found in its Size Standards Table under non-store retailers (subsection 454). Electronic Shopping has a size standard of $30M, Electronic Auctions: $35M, and Mail Order: $35M.

Agricultural Retailers Association (ARA), expressed opposition to the Marketplace Fairness Act in a letter to the House Judiciary Committee. They asserted that the costs associated with MFA obligations would be a major deterrent for agricultural retailers currently involved in e-commerce. The ARA additionally expressed concerns that the proposed tax software would be inexpensive or easy to implement. The ARA also mentioned difficulty keeping up with various sales tax exemption certificates and the threat of audits for agricultural retailers.

National Center for Policy Analysis (NCPA), a nonprofit, nonpartisan public policy research organization expressed concern that the Marketplace Fairness Act punishes sellers by requiring them to collect taxes for various state governments. The NCPA also raised questions about the amount of tax revenue that would be raised by the Marketplace Fairness Act because a large majority of e-commerce transactions are business-to-business. The research group takes the position that states should enforce use tax laws already on the books without burdening the private sector with the task.

Computer & Communications Industry Association (CCIA) an international not-for-profit organization takes the position that the Marketplace Fairness Act, "creates a new imbalance by requiring small online retailers to administer a tax collection regime for multiple jurisdictions, while brick-and-mortar stores need only collect for the jurisdiction of its physical location."

American Association of Attorney-Certified Public Accounts (AAA-CPA), the only organization of both attorneys and certified public accountants, takes the position that while the Marketplace Fairness Act addresses the issue of sales tax collection, it will place "crippling burdens" on interstate commerce and will harm the new internet marketplace. They state the goals of the Marketplace Fairness Act could be accomplished with "less burdensome means". James Sutton, AAA-CPA Chairman of State and Local Tax Committee, provided expert testimony to the House Judiciary Committee on March 12, 2014 that a 'Consumer Private Reporting' (CPR) system could be developed as an alternative to the Marketplace Fairness Act. The proposed CPR system would facilitate use tax collection at the state level without undue burdens on interstate commerce.

Electronic Retailers Association (ERA), a trade association of direct-to-consumer retailers expressed serious concern with the ability of small online retailers to absorb the costs associated with implementation. The association also takes the position that the Streamlined Sales Tax Project (SSTP) is not sufficiently simplified and would "decimate" small online retailers.

Direct Marketing Association (DMA) world's largest trade association dedicated to advancing data-driven marketing takes the position that the Marketplace Fairness Act interferes with the free flow of commerce between the states. The group called the MFA an 'unfunded mandate' to comply with complex and changing tax jurisdictions (nearly 10,000), tax holidays, and tax thresholds. The group also expressed concern that the MFA allows states to create their own definitions of what each taxable good is, allows each state to perform nationwide audits, and allows states to create their own tax forms as well as return schedules. The group also expresses concern that each state could interpret what the exact taxable value would be.

United Network Equipment Dealers Association (UNEDA) an association of nearly 300 firms re-marketing nearly $2 billion per year of network and computer equipment. This group had serious concerns with this bill. If it passed, they believed that MFA "would severely hurt UNEDA business with large potential collection, reporting and audit issues." The group urged their members to write to their congressman, support a lobbying effort and visit their Member of Congress.

== See also ==
- Online shopping
- Sales taxes in the United States
- E-commerce
- Internet Tax Freedom Act
- Permanent Internet Tax Freedom Act (H.R. 3086; 113th Congress)
