= Economic nexus in the United States =

United States Economic Nexus Thresholds

Economic nexus in the United States is a legal standard that U.S. states use to determine whether a business has a substantial connection with the state, thereby imposing the obligation to collect and remit sales tax. Unlike the traditional physical presence requirement, economic nexus is established through the volume or value of a business's economic activity within a state, such as reaching a certain threshold of sales or number of transactions.

The concept became central to U.S. state taxation following the 2018 Supreme Court decision in South Dakota v. Wayfair, Inc., which allowed states to require out-of-state or remote sellers to collect sales tax based solely on economic activity, even in the absence of physical presence. The ruling overturned decades of precedent, most notably the Quill Corp. v. North Dakota ruling, enabling states to expand tax compliance obligations to out-of-state or remote sellers, particularly those engaged in the e-commerce industry.

Since the decision, most U.S. states have enacted economic nexus laws, which have transformed sales tax compliance for businesses operating across state lines.

== History ==
=== Background ===
Before 2018, the authority of U.S. states to require businesses to collect sales tax was primarily governed by the North Dakota Supreme Court’s 1992 decision in Quill Corp. v. North Dakota. In that case, the Court reaffirmed the principle that a business must have a physical presence, which may be established by having an office, warehouses, or employees, in a state before the state could impose tax collection obligations. This physical presence, also known as the physical nexus, was rooted in the Commerce Clause of the U.S. Constitution, which limits state regulation of interstate commerce.

The Quill decision limited state tax enforcement, particularly as remote commerce and online sales began to grow rapidly in the early 2000s. States argued that the rule created a tax loophole, allowing out-of-state or remote sellers to avoid collecting, reporting, and remitting sales tax even when they generated substantial sales within the state. This situation placed brick-and-mortar businesses at a disadvantage and led to growing concern about lost tax revenue.

=== South Dakota v. Wayfair ===
The legal framework surrounding state sales tax collection changed dramatically with the 2018 Supreme Court’s ruling in South Dakota v. Wayfair, Inc. The State of South Dakota enacted a law requiring out-of-state sellers to collect and remit sales tax if they exceeded specific economic thresholds set at $100,000 in sales or 200 transactions annually in the state, regardless of physical presence.

The Supreme Court upheld South Dakota’s law, ruling that the physical presence requirement established in Quill was “outdated and artificial.” The Court reasoned that the substantial economic and technological changes in commerce justified a shift in legal standards. It concluded that a seller’s economic and virtual contacts with a state could constitute a sufficient nexus under the Commerce Clause. In its ruling, the Supreme Court noted that “states were losing between $694 million and $3 billion per year in sales tax revenues as a result of the physical presence rule”.

== State-by-State Economic Nexus Threshold Overview ==
State	Date When the Economic Nexus Regulations Were Introduced	Current Economic Nexus Threshold	Measurement Period	Sales Included in the Threshold	Registration Deadline Upon Exceeding the Threshold	Legislative Changes
Alabama	1 October 2018	$250,000 and specified activities	Previous calendar year	Retail sales Marketplace sales are excluded from the threshold for individual sellers	1 January following the year in which the threshold is exceeded	
Alaska	The Alaska Remote Seller Sales Tax Commission has passed its “Remote Seller Sales Tax Code & Common Definitions,” which applies to local municipalities in Alaska that choose to adopt it.	$100,000	Previous calendar year	Gross sales Marketplace sales are included towards the threshold for individual sellers.	The first day of the month following 30 days from adoption by the city or borough	Alaska removed its 200-transaction threshold, effective 1 January 2025.
Arizona	1 October 2019	$100,000	Previous or current calendar year	Gross sales Marketplace sales are excluded from the threshold for individual sellers	The first day of the month that starts at least thirty days after the threshold is met	In 2019, the threshold was set to $200,000, which was later decreased in 2020 to $150,000. In 2021, the current $100,000 threshold was defined.
Arkansas	1 July 2019	$100,000 or 200 or more separate transactions	Previous or current calendar year	Taxable sales Marketplace sales are excluded from the threshold for individual sellers	Next transaction after meeting the threshold	
California	1 April 2019	$500,000	Preceding or current calendar year	Gross sales of tangible personal property Marketplace sales are included towards the threshold for individual sellers	The day sellers exceed the threshold	On 25 April 2019, California removed its 200 transactions threshold and raised its sales threshold from $100,000
Colorado	1 December 2018, with a grace period through 31 May 2019	$100,000	Previous or current calendar year	Retail sales Marketplace sales are excluded from the threshold for individual sellers	On the 20th day after the retailer exceeded the threshold	On 14 April 2019, Colorado removed its 200 transactions threshold
Connecticut	1 December 2018	$100,000 and 200 transactions	12-month period ending on September 30	Retail sales Marketplace sales are included towards the threshold for individual sellers	October 1 of the year in which sellers crossed the threshold	On 1 July 2019, Connecticut decreased its dollar threshold from $250,000 to $100,000, keeping the number of transactions the same
District of Columbia	1 January 2019	$100,000 or 200 or more separate retail sales	Previous or current calendar year	Retail sales Marketplace sales are included towards the threshold for individual sellers	Next transaction after exceeding the threshold	
Florida	1 July 2021	$100,000	Previous calendar year	Taxable sales Marketplace sales are excluded from the threshold for individual sellers	The first of the following calendar year after sellers meet the threshold	
Georgia	1 January 2019	$100,000 or 200 or more sales	Previous or current calendar year	Retail sales of tangible personal property delivered electronically or physically, whether taxable or exempt Marketplace sales are excluded from the threshold for individual sellers	Next transaction after exceeding the threshold	Between 1 January 2019 and 1 January 2020, the threshold was $250,000 or 200 or more sales. On 1 January 2020, Georgia decreased their sales threshold to $100,000 and kept the 200 transactions threshold unchanged
Hawaii	1 July 2018	$100,000 or 200 or more separate transactions	Current or immediately preceding calendar year	Gross sales Marketplace sales are included towards the threshold for individual sellers	The first of the month following the month in which the threshold is met	
Idaho	1 June 2019	$100,000	Previous or current calendar year	Gross sales Marketplace sales are included towards the threshold for individual sellers	Not specified by the State	
Illinois	1 October 2018	$100,000 or 200 or more separate transactions	Preceding 12-month period	Retail sales Marketplace sales are excluded from the threshold for individual sellers	Retailers must determine every quarter whether they meet the criteria for the preceding 12-month period	From 1 January 2026, Illinois will remove its 200 transactions threshold
Indiana	1 October 2018	$100,000	The calendar year in which the retail transaction is made or for the calendar year preceding the calendar year in which the retail transaction is made	Gross sales Marketplace sales excluded from the threshold for individual sellers	Next transaction after exceeding the threshold	
Iowa	1 January 2019	$100,000	Current or immediately preceding calendar year	Gross sales Marketplace sales are included towards the threshold for individual sellers	The first day of the following calendar month that starts at least 30 days from the day the remote seller first exceeded the threshold	On 1 July 2019, Iowa removed its 200-transaction threshold
Kansas	1 July 2021	$100,000	Current or immediately preceding calendar year	Gross sales Marketplace sales are included towards the threshold for individual sellers	Next transaction after exceeding the threshold	Kansas originally introduced the economic nexus rules applicable to out-of-state or remote sellers in 2019. The initial legislation did not state a threshold. Therefore, any remote seller selling tangible goods or services into the state had to register and begin collecting tax by 1 October 2019
Kentucky	1 October 2018	$100,000 or 200 or more separate transactions	Previous or current calendar year	Gross sales Marketplace sales are included towards the threshold for individual sellers	The first of the month following 60 days after the threshold is me	
Louisiana	1 July 2020	$100,000	Previous or current calendar year	Retail sales Marketplace sales are excluded from the threshold for individual sellers	Within 30 days of exceeding the threshold	On 1 August 2023, Louisiana removed its 200 transactions threshold
Maine	1 July 2018	$100,000	Previous or current calendar year	Gross sales Marketplace sales are excluded from the threshold for individual sellers and do not include marketplace sales on returns if reported by the marketplace	The first day of the following calendar month that starts at least 30 days from the day the remote seller first exceeded the threshold	On 1 January 2022, Maine removed its 200 transactions threshold,
Maryland	1 October 2018	$100,000 or 200 or more separate transactions	Previous or current calendar year	Gross sales Marketplace sales included towards the threshold for individual sellers	First day of the month following the month in which the threshold is met	
Massachusetts	1 October 2017	$100,000	Previous or current calendar year	Gross sales Marketplace sales are excluded from the threshold for individual sellers if the marketplace facilitator is collecting	First day of the first month that starts two months after the month in which the remote retailer exceeded the threshold	On 1 October 2019, Massachusetts removed its 100 transactions threshold and decreased the $500,000 threshold to $100,000
Michigan	1 October 2018	$100,000 or 200 or more separate transactions	Previous calendar year	Gross sales Marketplace sales are included towards the threshold for individual sellers	1 January of the year following the year in which the threshold is exceeded	
Minnesota	1 October 2018	$100,000 or 200 or more retail sales	The 12 months ending on the last day of the most recently completed calendar quarter	Retail sales Marketplace sales are included towards the threshold for individual sellers	The first day of the calendar month occurring no later than 60 days after the threshold is exceeded	On 1 October 2019, Minnesota changed its previous threshold set at $100,000 and 10 sales or 100 transactions
Mississippi	1 September 2018	$250,000	The prior twelve-month period	Gross sales Marketplace sales are excluded from the threshold for individual sellers	Next transaction after exceeding the threshold	
Missouri	1 January 2023	$100,000	Previous calendar year	Taxable sales of tangible personal property Marketplace sales are included towards the threshold for individual sellers	No later than 3 months following the close of the quarter in which the threshold was exceeded	
Nebraska	1 April 2019	$100,000 or 200 or more separate transactions	Previous or current calendar year	Retail sales Marketplace sales are included towards the threshold for individual sellers	The first day of the second calendar month in which the threshold was exceeded	
Nevada	1 November 2018	$100,000 or 200 or more separate transactions	Previous or current calendar year	Retail sales Marketplace sales are included towards the threshold for individual sellers	The first day of the following calendar month that starts at least 30 days from the day the remote seller first exceeded the threshold	
New Jersey	1 November 2018	$100,000 or 200 or more separate transactions	Previous or current calendar year	Gross sales Marketplace sales are included towards the threshold for individual sellers	Sales must start collecting from the first taxable sale after the threshold is exceeded. There is a 30-day grace period to register	
New Mexico	1 July 2019	$100,000	Previous calendar year	Taxable sales Marketplace sales are excluded from the threshold for individual sellers	1 January following the year in which the threshold is exceeded	
New York	21 June 2018	$500,000 in sales of tangible personal property and more than 100 sales	Immediately preceding four sales tax quarters	Gross receipts from sales of tangible personal property Marketplace sales are included towards the threshold for individual sellers	Sellers must register within 30 days after exceeding the threshold	On 24 June 2019, New York increased its dollar threshold from $300,000 to $500,000, leaving the transaction threshold unchanged
North Carolina	1 November 2018	$100,000	Previous or current calendar year	Gross sales Marketplace sales are included towards the threshold for individual sellers	Next transaction after exceeding the threshold	On 1 July 2024, North Carolina removed its 200 or more separate transaction threshold
North Dakota	1 October 2018	$100,000	Previous or current calendar year	Taxable sales Marketplace sales are excluded from the threshold for individual sellers	The following calendar year or 60 days after the threshold is met, whichever is earlier	
Ohio	1 January 2018	$100,000 or 200 or more separate transactions	Previous or current calendar year	Retail sales Marketplace sales are included towards the threshold for individual sellers	The next day after exceeding the threshold	On 1 August 2019, Ohio decreased its threshold from $500,000 to $100,000 and added a 200-transaction threshold
Oklahoma	1 November 2019	$100,000 in aggregate sales of tangible personal property	Preceding or current calendar year	Taxable sales Marketplace sales are excluded from the threshold for individual sellers	The first calendar month following the month in which the threshold is met	
Pennsylvania	1 July 2019	$100,000	The prior calendar year	Gross sales on all channels, including taxable, exempt, and marketplace sales	April 1 of the following calendar year, in which the threshold was exceeded	On 1 April 2018, Pennsylvania enacted Notice and Reporting Requirements, which were later replaced by the economic nexus legislation
Rhode Island	1 July 2019	$100,000 or 200 or more separate transactions	Immediately preceding calendar year	Gross sales Marketplace sales are included towards the threshold for individual sellers	1 January following the year in which the threshold is exceeded	
South Carolina	1 November 2018	$100,000	Previous or current calendar year	Gross sales Marketplace sales are included towards the threshold for individual sellers	The first day of the second calendar month in which the threshold is exceeded	
South Dakota	1 November 2018	$100,000	Previous or current calendar year	Gross revenue Marketplace sales are included towards the threshold for individual sellers	The first whole month that begins at least 30 days after exceeding the threshold	On 1 July 2023, South Dakota removed its 200-transaction threshold
Tennessee	1 October 2019	$100,000	Previous 12-month period	Retail sales Marketplace sales are excluded from the threshold for individual sellers	The first day of the third month following the month in which the threshold is exceeded	On 1 October 2019, Tennessee decreased the threshold from $500,000 to $100,000
Texas	1 October 2019	$500,000	Previous 12-month period	Gross revenue, including taxable, non-taxable, and tax-exempt sales Marketplace sales are included towards the threshold for individual sellers	The first day of the fourth month after the month in which the seller exceeded the threshold	
Utah	1 January 2019	$100,000	Previous or current calendar year	Gross sales Marketplace sales are excluded from the threshold for individual sellers	The State does not specify	On 1 July 2025, Utah removed its 200 transactions threshold
Vermont	1 July 2018	$100,000 or 200 or more separate transactions	The prior four calendar quarters	Gross sales Marketplace sales are included towards the threshold for individual sellers	First of the month, after 30 days from the end of the quarter, in which the threshold is exceeded	
Virginia	1 July 2019	$100,000 or 200 or more separate transactions	Previous or current calendar year	Retail sales Marketplace sales are excluded from the threshold for individual sellers	Next transaction after exceeding the threshold	
Washington	1 October 2018	$100,000	Current or preceding calendar year	Gross sales Marketplace sales are included towards the threshold for individual sellers	The first day of the month that starts at least 30 days after the threshold is exceeded	Between 1 October 2018 and 31 December 2019, sellers with 200 or more separate transactions into Washington were subject to sales tax collection and remittance requirements. In the same period, retail sales were calculated towards the threshold. On 14 March 2019, Washington removed the $200 transaction threshold and replaced the retail sales standard with the gross sales standard
West Virginia	1 January 2019	$100,000 or 200 or more separate transactions	Preceding or current calendar year	Gross sales Marketplace sales are included towards the threshold for individual sellers	The State does not specify	
Wisconsin	1 October 2018	$100,000	Previous or current calendar year	Gross sales Marketplace sales are included towards the threshold for individual sellers	Next transaction after exceeding the threshold	On 20 February 2021, Wisconsin removed its 200 transactions threshold
Wyoming	1 February 2019	$100,000	Previous or current calendar year	Gross sales Marketplace sales are excluded from the threshold for individual sellers	Next transaction after exceeding the threshold	On 1 July 2024, Wyoming removed its 200 transactions threshold

Note: Economic thresholds are as of July 2025 and are subject to change.

== U.S. States Without Economic Nexus ==
Although the vast majority of the U.S. states that impose sales tax have adopted economic nexus laws, a small number of states do not impose a statewide sales tax. These states are Delaware, Oregon, Montana, and New Hampshire, and together with Alaska, they are known as the NOMAD states.

Delaware imposes a gross receipts tax on businesses that sell goods or provide services within the state. Remote or out-of-state sellers are exempt from paying gross receipts tax in Delaware, as it generally applies to businesses with physical nexus and activity within the state. Oregon imposes a vehicle privilege and use tax on new vehicles purchased out of state, and excise taxes are applied to products such as cigarettes and marijuana. Montana levies excise taxes on gasoline, alcohol, tobacco, lodgings, and other items.

Although it does not impose a state-wide sales tax, on January 6, 2020, the Alaska Remote Seller Sales Tax Commission passed its Remote Seller Sales Tax Code and Common Definitions, allowing local jurisdictions in Alaska to choose to adopt and implement economic nexus rules and requirements.

== See also ==
- South Dakota v. Wayfair, Inc.
- Quill Corp. v. North Dakota
- Sales taxes in the United States
- Streamlined Sales Tax Project
