= Direct Marketing Ass'n v. Brohl =

Direct Marketing Association v. Brohl
- Supreme Court of the United States

Argued December 8, 2014 Decided March 3, 2015
- Full case name: Direct Marketing Association, Petitioner v. Barbara Brohl, Executive Director, Colorado Department of Revenue
- Docket no.: 13-1032
- Citations: 575 U.S. 1 (more) 135 S. Ct. 1124; 191 L. Ed. 2d 97

Case history
- Prior: Direct Marketing Ass'n v. Huber, No. 1:10-cv-01546, 2012 WL 1079175 (D. Colo. Mar. 30, 2012); remanded sub. nom., Direct Marketing Ass'n v. Brohl, 735 F.3d 904 (10th Cir. 2013); cert. granted, 134 S. Ct. 2901 (2014).
- Subsequent: On remand, 814 F.3d 1129 (10th Cir. 2016); cert. denied, 137 S. Ct. 591 (2016).

Holding
- The Tax Injunction Act applies only to the assessment, levy, or collection of taxes, so it does not remove federal courts' jurisdiction to enjoin the enforcement of a tax law's notice and reporting requirements, which is a separate phase in the taxation process.

Court membership
- Chief Justice John Roberts Associate Justices Antonin Scalia · Anthony Kennedy; Clarence Thomas · Ruth Bader Ginsburg; Stephen Breyer · Samuel Alito; Sonia Sotomayor · Elena Kagan

Case opinions
- Majority: Thomas, joined by unanimous
- Concurrence: Kennedy
- Concurrence: Ginsburg, joined by Breyer; Sotomayor (in part)

Laws applied
- Tax Injunction Act; Dormant Commerce Clause

Direct Marketing Association v. Brohl, 575 U.S. 1 (2015), was a United States Supreme Court case in which the Court held that a lawsuit by the Direct Marketing Association trade group about a Colorado law regarding reporting the state's tax requirements to customers and to the Colorado Department of Revenue is not barred by the Tax Injunction Act. While the case was reheard and found in favor of Colorado, the concurrence of Justice Anthony Kennedy provided a means for states to bring a challenge the ruling of Quill Corp. v. North Dakota, which has prevented states from collecting taxes from out-of-state vendors.

== Background ==
The 1992 Supreme Court decision in Quill Corp. v. North Dakota, 504 U.S. 298 (1992), established that states could not collect sales taxes from out-of-state vendors if the vendors did not have a physical presence in the state, unless the United States Congress passed legislation giving them that right. This decision had allowed electronic business, including e-Commerce over the Internet, to grow greatly, but had hurt states financially due to their inability to legally require out-of-state vendors to collect and remit sales taxes, and states struggled to get people to honestly report untaxed purchases on personal tax returns.

In 2010, the state of Colorado passed a law that required out-of-state vendors to collect and provide information to its citizens regarding their total purchases, so that the residents could determine their tax liability for the state. The Direct Marketing Association (DMA, and now known as the Data & Marketing Association) filed a lawsuit in the federal Colorado District Court, Direct Marketing Ass'n v. Brohl, challenging the law. The District Court ruled in favor of the DMA, based on the principle of Quill. The state appealed to Tenth Circuit Appeals Court, which ruled that under the Tax Injunction Act, the case could not be heard at the federal level. The Appeals Court argued that the act of collecting the information on taxes is not the same as tax collection, so Quill did not apply, and the Tax Injunction Act set that legal challenges to such state laws should be heard in state courts.

== Supreme Court ==
The DMA took a separate challenge to the Colorado state court via Direct Marketing Ass'n v. Brohl II, but simultaneously filed an appeal with the Supreme Court to challenge the Appeals Court ruling. By March 2015, in a unanimous decision, Associate Justice Clarence Thomas held that "the relief sought by petitioner [Direct Marketing Association] would not 'enjoin, suspend or restrain the assessment, levy or collection' of Colorado's sales and use taxes." The case was remanded to the Appeals Court.

== Post-decision ==
The Appeals Court reviewed the case following the Supreme Court's decision, but still found in favor of the state. In their opinion, the Appeals Court stated that the state law "does not violate the dormant Commerce Clause because it does not discriminate against or unduly burden interstate commerce", and remanded the case to the District Court.

The DMA tried to appeal this decision back to the Supreme Court, but the Court refused to hear the case in December 2016. By February 2017, the DMA and the state of Colorado had reached a settlement, with the DMA agreeing to drop the state and federal lawsuits in exchange for the state ignoring the penalty fees during the intervening years for non-compliance of the reporting requirements.

== Impact ==
A core facet of the Supreme Court's decision in Direct Marketing Ass'n came from Justice Anthony Kennedy's concurrence. Kennedy specifically wrote about Quill's "tenuous nature", and the "serious, continuing injustice faced by Colorado and many other States" of being able to only collect sales taxes from brick-and-mortar stores, and offered "it is unwise to delay any longer a reconsideration of the Court's holding in Quill". Kennedy's concurrence was taken by many analysts and states that Kennedy was inviting a case to force the Supreme Court to review Quill. This led to at least twenty states to develop so-called "kill Quill" legislation, forcing out-of-state vendors to collect state sales tax, as to provide a legal vehicle to bring to the Supreme Court for a formal review of Quill. South Dakota was the first state to have passed its laws, filed lawsuits against out-of-state vendors, and progressed their case through the state courts to appeal to the Supreme Court for this purpose. On June 21, 2018, Quill was overruled by South Dakota v. Wayfair, Inc..

== See also ==
- List of United States Supreme Court cases
- List of United States Supreme Court cases, volume 575
- Miller Bros. Co. v. Maryland (1954)
- National Bellas Hess v. Illinois (1967)
- South Dakota v. Wayfair, Inc. (2018)
