= Internet tax =

Financial levy on Internet-based services

Internet tax is a tax on Internet-based services. Either as a consumption-based sales tax or even a direct tax on high-income providers. A number of jurisdictions have introduced an Internet tax and others are considering doing so mainly as a result of successful tax avoidance by multinational corporations that operate within the digital economy.

As of 2019, several countries have passed various Internet tax laws including France and Italy (at 3%) as well as the Czech Republic (7%).

== Forms of Internet taxation ==
=== Internet access tax ===
Internet access taxes normally take the form of taxation on Internet service provider (ISP) access charges. ISPs levy these charges on users. Currently, these fees are typically imposed at the state level. There is no national tax on ISP user charges. No uniform description of Internet access taxes is possible; they fall within the category of sales taxes in some states, and telecommunications taxes in others; and they are considered service charges, which are usually exempt from taxation, in still other states. Ten states (which were grandfathered under the Internet Tax Freedom Act as part of a political compromise) are allowed to provide for some manner of taxation on ISP charges. The ten states are Hawaii, New Hampshire, New Mexico, North Dakota, Ohio, South Dakota, Tennessee, Texas, Washington & Wisconsin.

Under the grandfather clause included in the Internet Tax Freedom Act, Texas is currently collecting a tax on Internet access charges over $25.00 per month. Texas collected tax on internet access prior to the enactment of ITFA under the "Taxables Services" provision of its Tax Code, see older § 151.0101(a). Texas has refined its tax code to define "Internet access service", include it under "Taxable Services" and exempted the first $25.00 on a monthly basis, See current Texas Tax Code § 151.325 & 151.0101(a).

==== E-mail tax ====
E-mail tax is a specific type of bit-tax, which would tax based on volume of email sent or received, quantified either by number of messages or data size of the messages. This type of tax was mentioned in a 1999 report by the United Nations Development Program entitled "Globalization With a Human Face", as a type of bit tax which would raise an estimated $70 billion (US) if implemented globally. The e-mail tax has been the subject of numerous internet and political hoaxes. Imposition of e-mail taxes by the U.S. government or any of its political subdivisions is banned by the Internet Tax Freedom Act. The proposal also lacks merit as two individuals running their own open-source email servers on non-commercially owned provider's equipment could avoid the taxation.

== Conceptual issues ==
Beyond the questions of direct taxation of Internet access through levies such as bit taxes, bandwidth taxes, email taxes, and franchise fees, a related issue concerns the imposition of sales taxes on Internet sales of goods and services. This taxation is not prohibited by federal statute, but rather by a series of U.S. Supreme Court decisions including Quill Corp. v. North Dakota (1992). Those cases held that state taxation of in-state sales by vendors with no significant physical presence in the state violates the Commerce Clause of the U.S. Constitution. Because of this constitutional prohibition on collecting sales tax from so-called "remote" sales on the Internet, the issue of local jurisdictions taxing goods and services purchased from out of state by their residents using the Internet has not yet raised the conceptual questions discussed below. See tax-free shopping.

=== Location ===
The issue of location—of the Internet user, the user's counterparties in a commercial transaction, the headquarters facilities of any involved commercial entities, and even the servers and switches—is important for tax purposes. For example, of the nine U.S. states that currently tax access in some manner, four make reference to location. In each case, both the provision of service and the billing must take place within the state. Connecticut places the burden of determining whether this is so upon the Internet service provider. But in general, there is no simple way to determine location, owing largely to the Internet's lack of boundaries. Users can and routinely do access their accounts from remote locations; providers are almost always located in multiple taxing jurisdictions; and the data traffic itself, via the Internet's packet-switched architecture, is routed through myriad locations. Such issues are important not only for practical reasons of determining the incidence of the tax and its enforcement, but also because the U.S. Constitution requires that a state or taxing sub-jurisdiction have "nexus" with the transaction in order to exert its taxing power, and that determination rests precisely upon such considerations.

=== Setup v. monthly fee ===
In the United States, some states and taxing authorities distinguish between the initial setup fee for Internet access and the monthly, hourly, or per-minute billing fee for actual access. Nebraska taxes the initial setup, but only if software is provided. It does not tax subsequent monthly billing. Tennessee, on the other hand, taxes both.

=== Good vs. service ===
A basic issue in determining whether Internet access and Internet usage of various kinds is subject to sales tax, use tax, telecommunications tax, a combination of these taxes, or no taxes at all, is whether Internet access and usage is determined to be a "good" or a "service." If access to the Internet or usage is deemed a service, in general no sales or use taxation applies, while the rates and variants of telecommunications taxes that apply can be different. However, if access requires downloading of user software, some U.S. states (e.g., Massachusetts) may deem that to be a "taxable sale" of goods for their residents.

=== Collection ===
Collection of Internet taxes presents a complex array of issues. These include whether states themselves should collect the tax; whether the burden instead should be placed on the Internet service provider; the extent to which retailers or value-added intermediaries can be required to perform collection duties; and in all cases, the ways in which this collection can be accurately and meaningfully enforced by the taxing jurisdiction. The roots of these issues stem from two debates. The first is the constitutionality of requiring internet businesses to collect taxes relating to the "Due Process" and "Commerce" clause of the constitution which require fair action by the government and no undue burden placed on interstate commerce. The second is whether the economic benefit gained from taxation outweighs the economic costs of enforcing the taxation.

== Internet tax by country ==
=== Africa ===
==== Uganda ====
On May 30, 2018, the Ugandan parliament passed The Excise Duty Amendment Bill which proposed that;

- A person providing an excisable service becomes liable to pay excise duty on that service on the earlier of the date on which the performance of the service is completed; the date on which payment for the service is made; or the date on which an invoice is issued.
- A telecommunications service operator providing data used for accessing over the top services is liable to account for and pay excise duty on the access to the over the top services.

“Over the top services" are defined as the transmission or receipt of voice or messages over the internet protocol network and includes access to virtual private networks but does not include educational or research sites prescribed by the Minister by notice in the Gazette.

=== Americas ===
==== United States ====
In 1996, several U.S. states and municipalities began to see Internet services as a potential source of tax revenue.

The 1998 Internet Tax Freedom Act halted the expansion of direct taxation of the Internet, grandfathering existing taxes in ten states. In the United States alone, some 30,000 taxing jurisdictions could otherwise have laid claim to taxes on a piece of the Internet. The law, however, did not affect sales taxes applied to online purchases. These continue to be taxed at varying rates depending on the jurisdiction, in the same way that phone and mail orders are taxed.

The 1998 Internet Tax Freedom Act was authored by Representative Christopher Cox, R-CA and Senator Ron Wyden, D-OR and signed into law on October 21, 1998 by President Bill Clinton in an effort to promote and preserve the commercial potential of the Internet. This law bars federal, state, and local governments from taxing Internet access and from imposing discriminatory Internet-only taxes such as bit taxes, bandwidth taxes, and e-mail taxes. The law also bars multiple taxes on electronic commerce.

The 1998 bill had been extended three times by the United States Congress since its original enactment and was last renewed on October 30, 2007 for 7 years. On Feb. 11, 2016 the U.S. Congress passed the Permanent Internet Tax Freedom Act and sent the bill to President Barack Obama for his expected signature.

=== Asia ===
==== Bhutan ====
In 2014, the Kingdom of Bhutan imposed a 5% sales tax on all internet services.

==== Pakistan ====
Government of Pakistan has imposed 14% tax on internet across Pakistan. With this new advance tax which can be reclaimed at the time of filing of returns 14% of the bill amount is supposed to get deducted on internet usage across Pakistan. A vast majority of people took to Social networking websites to voice their grievances. With the imposition of this tax, Pakistan became the most heavily internet-taxed region of the world.

=== European Union ===
In March 2018 European Commission proposed new rules for digital taxation, including interim tax, with long-term solution that profits should be registered and taxed where businesses have significant interaction with users through digital channels. In March 2019 the proposal was refused by European Council, being blocked by Ireland, Sweden and Denmark. However multiple Member States proposed national taxes based on the framework of the proposed interim tax.

==== Czech Republic ====
In November 2019 the Government of the Czech Republic approved digital tax of 7% (not yet approved by the parliament) that will affect web-based services of businesses with an annual global turnover of over €750 million.

==== France ====
French President Nicolas Sarkozy announced on January 8, 2008, that he would propose taxing the Internet as a way to fund the country's state-owned television stations. The proposition came as part of a broader plan for the French audiovisual network; the plan also included provisions such as the "total suppression of advertising on public channels" whose funding would then be aided by "an infinitesimal sales tax on new communication methods, like Internet access and mobile telephony.". France passed a 3% Internet tax law in July 2019.

==== Hungary ====
In 2014 the Hungarian government proposed an internet tax and were opposed by a mass movement against it.

==== Italy ====
In October 2019 Italy approved a 3% digital tax.

=== Rest of Europe ===
==== United Kingdom ====
In July 2019 the UK government published the Finance Bill 2019-20 which included provision for a Digital Services Tax of 2% of revenues of companies with more than £500m global revenue and more than £25m UK revenue. It was confirmed in the 2020 Budget that the tax would come into effect on 1 April 2020. The proposals were enacted as Part 2 of the Finance Act 2020.

== See also ==
- Internet Tax Nondiscrimination Act
- Sales taxes in the United States
- Taxation in the United States
- Taxation of Digital Goods
