= AmeriMark Direct =

Defunct American mail order company

AmeriMark Direct was an American privately held mail order and direct marketing company founded in 1969 and based in Cleveland, Ohio, United States. It operated 10 catalogs and 7 websites and specialized in ladies apparel, shoes, jewelry and accessories, perfumes, fragrances and cosmetics, diet and weight loss, personal care products, As Seen on TV products and housewares. The company had about $400 million in annual revenue and employed 700 in the Cleveland suburbs of Middleburg Heights, Ohio and Berea, Ohio. The company was a member of the American Catalog Mailers Association.

== History ==
The company was founded in 1969 by Avvy Katz when he established Anthony Richards, a women's apparel catalog featuring a variety of affordable clothing. Katz subsequently acquired two additional catalogs – Beauty Boutique and Windsor Collection. The Beauty Boutique catalog contained numerous beauty products including popular perfumes and fragrances while the Windsor Collection featured value-priced fashion jewelry. In 1995, Katz started a discount healthcare catalog titled Healthy Living. In 1998, Gary Giesler and his partners acquired Katz's company which became TransAmerica Holdings. Two years later in 2000, the company was renamed AmeriMark Direct. At this time, AmeriMark Direct established a shoe catalog titled Complements, which was a spin-off from the Anthony Richards catalog. In addition, the company launched its first website – AmeriMark.com In 2005, a private equity firm acquired a 75% stake in AmeriMark Direct. During this year, the company launched a new catalog titled Time For Me which featured upscale relaxation items as well as diet, fitness, foot care and intimacy products. The companion website, TimeForMeCatalog.com was also established at this time. Also in 2005, the company created a second spin-off from Anthony Richards called Essentials. This catalog offered a variety of intimate apparel items including women's pajamas, bras, briefs and panties.

In 2006, the company launched BeautyBoutique.com to support its namesake catalog. In December 2007, the company formed AmeriMark Holdings which acquired Dr. Leonard's Healthcare Corp. located in Edison, New Jersey with additional operations in Lincoln, Nebraska. AmeriMark Holdings also became the parent company for AmeriMark Direct at this time. Dr. Leonard's, which was founded in 1980, is a direct marketer of health products, As Seen on TV, clothing, collectibles, exercise equipment, home furnishings, housewares, and shoes for senior citizens. Dr. Leonard's markets through two catalog titles, Dr.Leonard's and Carol Wright Gifts, and related websites Dr.Leonards.com and CarolWrightGifts.com AmeriMark ranked #296 in the Internet Retail Top 500 Guide in 2007.

On April 11, 2023, AmeriMark filed for Chapter 11 bankruptcy, blaming rising interest rates, extreme fluctuations in demand from the COVID-19 pandemic, and catalog printing delays and deficiencies as the cause of the decision. On April 12, 2023, AmeriMark announced that it would lay off 223 employees and permanently shutter facilities in Middleburg Heights and Berea.

On June 16, 2023, Colony Brands, Inc. acquired some of AmeriMark's assets, adding 12 additional brands to Colony Brands.
