= Franchise tax =

Levied by some US states on certain businesses

A franchise tax is a government levy (tax) charged by some US states to certain business organizations such as corporations and partnerships with a nexus in the state. A franchise tax is not based on income. Rather, the typical franchise tax calculation is based on the net worth of capital held by the entity. The franchise tax effectively charges corporations for the privilege of doing business in the state.

== Nexus ==
Whether or not a business must pay a franchise tax to the state in which it does business can cause some confusion. Some states report using both the economic and physical presence tests, and in some states, there are no written, public interpretations of their test at all.

== Physical presence test ==
The physical presence test is based on Quill Corp. v. North Dakota, ( 504 U.S. 298 (1992)), a United States Supreme Court ruling concerning use tax. Quill Corporation is an office supply retailer. Quill had no physical presence in North Dakota (neither a sales force, nor a retail outlet). Still, it had a licensed computer software program that some of its North Dakota customers used to check Quill's current inventories and place orders directly. North Dakota attempted to impose a use tax on Quill, which was struck down by the Supreme Court, because Quill had no physical presence in North Dakota.

The Quill physical presence test is used by some states to determine whether or not a company must pay a franchise tax. Delaware, Hawaii, Massachusetts, Pennsylvania, and Texas report using the physical presence test.

== Economic presence test ==
Following a statement made in a concurrence opinion by Justice Anthony Kennedy in a 2015 related case, which suggested that it was time to review the decision of Quill in the wake of modern technology, more than 20 states passed "kill Quill" legislation intending to collect sales tax from out-of-state vendors and did so purposely to provide the necessary legal vehicle to take to the Supreme Court. South Dakota was the first state to make its case through lower courts to the Supreme Court.

The Supreme Court granted a writ of certiorari in January 2018, heard the case on April 17, 2018, and issued its decision on June 21, 2018. The court determined that the physical-presence rule of Quill was "unsound and incorrect" and overruled it, along with National Bellas Hess v. Illinois, parts of which Quill had already overturned. The Court vacated the South Dakota Supreme Court's judgment and remanded the case back to that court. The court stated that, "The Internet's prevalence and power have changed the dynamics of the national economy.". It noted that when Quill was decided, revenues for mail order products were around US$180 million and that e-commerce retail sales in 2017 were estimated at US$453.5 billion.

== Amount ==
As of 2010, about half the U.S. states do not impose a franchise tax. For states that have a franchise tax, the amount is often either a flat fee or based on the size of the business's total holdings.

== Relationship to corporate tax ==
States with higher corporate income taxes usually have low or no franchise taxes and vice versa.

== Delaware ==
The state of Delaware has a significant franchise tax. Other states have either nominal taxes or none at all.

== See also ==
- California Franchise Tax Board
