= Taxation of digital goods =

Digital goods are software programs, music, videos or other electronic files that users download exclusively from the Internet. Some digital goods are free, others are available for a fee. The taxation of digital goods and/or services, sometimes referred to as digital tax and/or a digital services tax, is gaining popularity across the globe.

The digital economy makes up 15.5% of global GDP in 2021 and has grown two and a half times faster than global GDP over the past 15 years, according to the World Bank. Many of the largest digital goods and services companies are multinational, often headquartered in the United States and operating internationally. There are significant differences in corporate tax rates between countries, and multinational companies can legally use base erosion and profit shifting (BEPS) to report their profits against intellectual property held in low tax jurisdictions (tax havens) to reduce their corporation tax liabilities. This has led to many new legal and regulatory considerations. In the field of international taxation, there has been debate about whether the current rules are appropriate in the modern global economy, especially regarding the allocation of income and profits among countries and the effect of this on taxes paid in each country.

Almost 50 jurisdictions have made changes in their current legislation regarding the taxation to include the digital tax, or presented new laws focused on taxation of digital economy.

== Background ==
=== Reform to the international tax system ===
In 2013, the Organization for Economic Cooperation and Development (OECD) began a project to examine base erosion and profit shifting (BEPS) of multinational companies (MNCs), with aim to create a single set of consensus-based international tax rules. In 2015, G20 Finance Ministers agreed a series of recommendations for setting minimum standards in national tax systems, revising international standards for the way those systems interlock, and promoting best practices. Under the auspices of the G20, an interim report was made in March 2018. In June 2019, G20 Finance Ministers agreed proposals drawn up by the OECD to find a consensus-based solution by the end of 2020. Later that year, the OECD launched a two-part consultation: first, proposals for determining where tax should be paid and on what basis ('nexus'), as well as what portion of profits could or should be taxed in the jurisdictions where clients or users are located ('profit allocation'); and, second, a proposal for a 'global minimum corporate tax level'. In October 2020, the OECD announced that it expects an agreement by mid-2021. The agreement was endorsed by the G7 Finance Ministers in June 2021.

=== National digital services taxes ===
In the meantime, several countries led first by the European Union have begun to propose and implement digital services taxes (DSTs) which have a number of aims: to raise tax revenues; to put pressure on other countries – in particular the United States – to reach an agreement; and, arguably, to create a level playing field until the OECD/G20 framework reaches an agreement or comes into force. Public debate in many countries has asked whether Big Tech companies are paying too little tax.

These national DSTs are mainly aimed at a small number of large digital companies that meet a worldwide revenue threshold and a domestic taxable sales threshold. In practice, most of these companies have their headquarters in the United States. The DSTs that have been proposed or implemented have similar characteristics and almost all were announced to be temporary measures. They are a mix of gross receipts taxes and transaction taxes that apply at rates ranging from 1.5% to 7.5% on receipts from the sale of advertising space, provision of digital intermediary services such as the operation of online marketplaces, and the sale of data collected from users. The attribution of revenue to a jurisdiction is generally based on whether the taxed service is viewed or enjoyed by a consumer on a device located in the jurisdiction based on its IP address or another geolocation method. Some countries have adopted various exemptions to the DST, including for payment services, digital content, and intragroup services.

==== Criticism ====
Digital services taxes have been criticized for a number of reasons including: distorting market behavior by discriminating primarily against large U.S. MNCs and therefore providing a relative advantage to other countries' businesses that fall below the revenue threshold; taxing a business input that will likely be passed on to consumers (even though some jurisdictions, like France, have stated that consumers should not absorb the tax, several companies have already announced that they would increase their prices because of these DSTs); and, lack of harmonization in the application of these taxes which may result in double taxation if, for example, two or more countries tax the same revenue stream.

== North America ==
=== United States ===
Status of taxation of digital goods per state: States relying on general tax laws to govern digital goods States that have enacted laws specifically addressing digital goods taxation States that expressly do not tax digital goods Status not known Other countries

In the United States, taxation of digital goods is partially governed by a federal statute and has been the area of significant state legislative and rule-making activity. States initially were slow to enact taxes on downloads, but with recent downturns in tax revenue caused by consumers purchasing more digital downloads, many states have sought ways to impose taxes on purely digital transactions. There are multiple ways that downloads are taxed; some states use their existing franchise, sales, and use taxes to tax purchases/uses/transactions of consumers of Internet goods and services, while other states enacted laws specifically aimed at digital downloads.

==== History ====
In 1997, the United States federal government decided to limit taxation of Internet activity for a period of time. The Internet Tax Freedom Act (ITFA) prohibits taxes on Internet access, which is defined as a service that allows users access to content, information, email or other services offered over the Internet and may include access to proprietary content, information, and other services as part of a package offered to customers. The Act has exceptions for taxes levied before the statute was written and for sales taxes on online purchases of physical goods.

The statute has been amended three times since its enactment to extend this prohibition. The first amendment solely extended the Act's duration. The second extended it again and clarified the definition of Internet access as including certain telecommunication services, as well as reorganizing sections within the Act. The third amendment again extended the prohibition but narrowed the definition of Internet access to "not include voice, audio or video programming, or other products and services ... that utilize Internet protocol ... and for which there is a charge" except those related to a homepage, email, instant messaging, video clips, and personal storage capacity.

In 2009, Anna Eshoo, Congresswoman from California's 14th District (which includes most of Silicon Valley), introduced a bill to make the Act permanent in its most recent permutation. However, this bill died in committee.

States levying a tax on digital goods may be violating the ITFA. The states using their original tax code may fall within the grandfather clause of the ITFA, but there has been no litigation to clarify this or other aspects of the Act. One of the few cases brought under the ITFA involved Community Telecable of Seattle suing the city of Seattle in Washington state court, where Telecable claimed it should not have to pay a telephone utility tax because it was an Internet access provider under the ITFA. The Washington State Supreme Court held that Telecable could not be taxed as a telephone provider when it was providing Internet access under the ITFA.

Every digital-specific tax created by a state has been enacted after the ITFA became law. These laws may be preempted because the ITFA bars taxes on Internet access, and multiple or discriminatory taxes on electronic commerce. Courts have yet to clarify whether the existing laws compound taxes or are discriminatory, although it is likely that these laws can survive scrutiny under the ITFA because they can be interpreted to only tax services that fit within the exception to Internet access described in the statute and to be the only taxes on these digital products. On the other hand, there may be problems with these taxes because they may cover products and services dealing with homepages, email, personal storage, or video clips.

Without litigation, it may be difficult to distinguish the difference between the definitions of content given by the ITFA, such as between a video clip and video programming. iTunes, for example, could be designated as video programming for the videos it sells based on the definition found in the federal statute regulating cable companies, and as video clips for its previews. These laws may also run into trouble if they tax a download that is already taxed by another state, because multiple taxes are defined as taxing property that has been taxed once before by another state or political subdivision.

Another possible federal limitation on Internet taxation is the United States Supreme Court case, Quill Corp. v. North Dakota, 504 U.S. 298 (1992), which held that under the dormant commerce clause, goods purchased through mail order cannot be subject to a state's sales tax unless the vendor has a substantial nexus with the state levying the tax. The dormant commerce clause could also apply to any efforts to tax downloads. Since most downloads are from companies that are centralized in a small number of states, it is likely that there will not be many states with a substantial nexus to download providers. At present, no litigation has arisen to determine what will be defined as a proper nexus for a distributor of digital content within a state. It is possible that a state would argue that servers are enough of a nexus to tax the content passing through, although the Supreme Court has already ruled that communication by common carrier is not enough to form a substantial nexus.

==== States relying on general tax laws to govern digital goods ====
Some states presume that downloads are automatically covered by their existing tax statutes based on the common law definition of tangible personal property, which is anything that holds value on its own that is not real property.

- Alabama
- Arizona – Uses definition of tangible personal property to be anything that can be discerned by human perception, which includes digital goods transmitted electronically.
- New Mexico – New Mexico Property Tax Code § 7.35.2
- Utah – Clarified its tax law to include digital products in 2008, though it claimed sales tax on these products prior to the amendment.
- West Virginia

In other states, state tax boards have released bulletins to explain what products are subject to sales and use taxes, tax administrative boards have handed down revenue rulings, and statutes have been amended to define "tangible personal property" to include digital goods and therefore subject them to sales tax.

- Indiana – Interprets tangible personal property as anything that can be perceived by the senses, including electricity, water, gas and steam. Yet, the taxes do not reach as far as purchasing virtual points for an online game because the points themselves cannot be "perceived".
- Louisiana – The Supreme Court of Louisiana has interpreted tangible personal property to be equivalent to corporeal movable property. Article 471 of Louisiana's Civil Code defines corporeal movable property as things that physically exist and normally move or can be moved from one place to another, which is then illustrated by examples, including digital or electronic products such as audio and video downloads.
- Maine – Taxes all "tangible personal property" that includes any computer software that is not a "custom computer software program". A custom computer software program is a program made in a single instance for a single customer.
- Texas – Defines "taxable items" as including tangible personal property in electronic form instead of in physical form. TX Tax Code §151.010. This is in addition to an administrative ruling holding that electronically transmitted music is the same as taxable tangible personal property.

==== States that have enacted laws specifically addressing digital goods taxation ====
The remaining states that tax downloads have specific statutes that define exactly what is to be taxed and what is not. The similarity in these taxes is that they are based on a sales-type scheme, where each download (or group of downloads) is taxed like a purchase in physical space.

- Colorado – As of July 1, 2012, software is only taxable if it is prepackaged for sale, is governed by a license agreement, and is delivered in a tangible medium.
- Connecticut – As long as no tangible personal property is provided in the transaction, sales or purchases of "digital downloads" are treated as sales or purchases of computer and data processing services, and taxable at a 1% rate. As of October 1, 2019, the tax for digital downloads was changed from 1% to 6.35%.
- Idaho – Includes in its tax code a sales tax on "canned" software, no matter the method of delivery. Other digital products are then defined as canned software.
- Kentucky – Defines digital property and then taxes it as common tangible personal property.
- Maryland – Tax on digital advertising, which was struck down as being in violation of the Internet Tax Freedom Act.
- Nebraska – Statute providing for taxes on sales of digital audio works, digital audiovisual works, and digital books. Further, the state taxes digital codes that provide the purchaser with the right to obtain one or more of these products delivered electronically.
- New Jersey – Statute taxes all digital property delivered through electronic means, such as music, ringtones, movies, books, audio and video works, and similar products.
- South Dakota – Created a specific statute levying a tax on electronically delivered products, defining the products as analogs of their physical counterparts (CDs, DVDs, etc.).
- Tennessee – Amended its sales tax to include digital products, which include "specified digital products" sold with either permanent ownership rights or for less than permanent use.
- Vermont – Created a specific tax on digital audio-visual works, digital audio works, digital books and ringtones that are transferred electronically.
- Washington State – Has a digital download and digital service specific tax. This tax applies solely to the digital realm, with many exceptions (presumably to avoid preemption by the Internet Tax Freedom Act).
- Wisconsin – Statute specifies for taxation purposes, digital audio-visual works, digital audio works, and digital books, along with greeting cards, finished artwork, periodicals, video or electronic games, and newspapers or other news or information products that are transferred electronically.

==== States that expressly do not tax digital goods ====
- North Dakota – Defined digital products and then specifically exempted them from taxation.
- Washington, D.C. – Has a sales tax only on data processing and information services which include the distribution of news or current information. However, the tax statute specifically disclaims sales of digital content and certain Internet related services. Title 47 §2001(n)(1)(N) & (n)(2)(G).

Some of these laws specifically address the taxation of software, which may or may not be interpreted by those states' courts to include downloadable content, i.e. music and video files.

==== Response to other countries' digital services taxes ====
In response to other countries digital services taxes, the U.S. has threatened to impose retaliatory tariffs, arguing that DSTs unfairly target U.S. multinational corporations (MNCs). In June 2025, American president Donald Trump suddenly stopped all trade negotiations with Canada, in retaliation for the existence of Canada's DST, claiming in a post on his Truth Social that the Canadian tax constituted a direct attack on the U.S.

=== Canada ===
Canada's digital services tax (DST) act entered into force on 28 June 2024, with first payment due by 30 June 2025. The tax is retroactive to 1 January 2022 because the government held off enacting the legislation in the hope that the multinational OECD/G20 Inclusive Framework agreement on corporate taxes would be reached. Canada's approach has met opposition from the United States Trade Representative's office. Firms that have global annual income of at least €750 million (approximately US$800 million) will see annual Canadian-source digital services revenue over CAN$20 million (approximately US$14 million) taxed at a rate of three per cent. Government DST revenue was forecast at CAN$7.2 billion (approximately US$5 billion) over the five years from 2023/24 to 2027/28.

== Legal status in Europe ==
=== European Union ===
The EU operates Value Added Tax (VAT) and electronic goods and services are subject to VAT at the applicable rate. Each member state may set its own rate of VAT if they want.

VAT regulations are very complicated and the intent of this article is not to provide definitive guidance but rather to list some of the relevant factors.

==== Businesses located within an EU member state ====
If a business is located within an EU member state and its turnover through internet sales or otherwise exceeds that member state's VAT threshold then the business must register for VAT. It is then obliged to collect VAT on its sales (outputs) and remit it to the tax authorities having deducted the VAT it pays on its purchases (inputs).

===== Distance selling threshold =====
If a business makes sales of physical goods to a member state that exceeds that member states distance selling threshold (typically either €30,000 or €100,000), then it must register to pay VAT in that member state and collect VAT at that member state's VAT rate.

If sales are below the distance selling threshold, VAT must be collected at the VAT rate in the business' own member state.

===== Selling e-services within the EU =====
If a business is located within an EU member state and supplies e-services to an individual who is not VAT registered in another EU member state then VAT rules of the state where the business is located apply. If the business supplies e-services to a VAT-registered individual in another state then the business is not obliged to pay VAT in its state and thus the individual must pay VAT in its state. If the business supplies e-services to a VAT-registered individual yet the individual receives the e-services in a state where neither the business nor the individual has their establishment then the business is obliged to register for VAT in the state where the e-services are delivered to. The 2015 EU VAT legislation requires two non-conflicting pieces of evidence to be produced so as to determine what VAT rate should be applied to these digital goods sales.

A business must always charge VAT to non-VAT registered entities (i.e. consumers) but should not charge VAT to foreign EU VAT registered businesses who provide them with a VAT number. These foreign EU businesses are required to declare their purchase and the tax due to their own tax authorities.

==== Digital services tax ====
In 2018, the European Commission (EC) proposed a temporary Digital Services Tax (DST) to be imposed at a rate of 3% on revenues derived from online advertising services, receipts or income from digital intermediary activities, and sales of user-collected data. The proposed tax would cover businesses with annual worldwide revenues exceeding $915 million (€750 million), and taxable revenues within the EU exceeding $61 million (€50 million). The initial EC proposal was rejected at the EU level.

=== National digital services taxes of EU countries ===
Although the initial EC proposal was rejected at the EU level, several EU countries – Austria, France, Italy, Poland, and Spain – implemented national digital services taxes and other proposed taxes or stated their intention to do so – Belgium, Czech Republic, Latvia, and Slovenia. Austria applies its DST only to digital advertising, while Poland assesses its DST only on streaming services.

=== United Kingdom ===
The UK's digital service tax imposes a 2% tax on the gross revenues of large multinationals operating search engines, social media platforms and online marketplaces to the extent that their revenues are linked to the participation of UK users. It applies to revenue earned from 1 April 2020. Government DST revenue in the first year of operation, 2020–21, was £358 million. Eighteen corporate groups paid DST in 2020–21, and five of those accounted for 90% of all receipts. Currently, the U.K. is the only country to have provisions in place to avoid double taxation.

=== Turkey ===
Turkey levies a digital services tax on digital content as well as on digital advertising, intermediary activities, and the sale of user data.

== Oceania ==
In his budget of May 12, 2015, the then Australian Federal Government Treasurer Joe Hockey revealed details of a new 10% goods and services tax (GST) to be introduced on "certain electronic supplies".

The proposed GST has already been dubbed the 'Netflix Tax' in Australia as on-demand video-streaming is one of the services that will come under the scope of the new rules. The Australian GST on digital services is due to come into effect in July 2017.

On February 10, 2016, the draft bill outlining Australia's new digital GST was introduced with Treasurer Scott Morrison telling the Australian Parliament that the new rules would "ensure Australian businesses selling digital products and services are not disadvantaged relative to overseas businesses that sell equivalent products in Australia."

== Asia ==
=== India ===
India implemented an Equalization Levy. The threshold of the expanded equalization levy in India is lower than in other countries – nonresident businesses must comply with the levy if they have taxable gross receipts above INR 20 million ($260,000). India did not state that the Levy would only be a temporary measure.

=== Singapore ===
Singapore was the first state in its region to consider implementing digital tax into its tax system. The idea was revealed in February 2018 and the according bill passed by the parliament of Singapore in November of the same year to come in effect on 1 January 2020. The main reasoning behind this was explained by the Singapore Finance Minister Heng Swee Keat who said during his speech about budget in 2018: "Today, services such as consultancy and marketing purchased from overseas suppliers are not subject to GST. Local consumers also do not pay GST when they download apps and music from overseas. This change will ensure that imported and local services are accorded the same treatment." It is estimated that implementing of the digital tax will bring Singapore US$65.5 million per year. The implemented tax will be at the same level as the GST (Goods and service tax) rate nowadays in Singapore, which was 7% at the time but increased to 9% in 2024.

=== Malaysia ===
Following Singapore, Malaysia was the second to make step towards implementing of the digital tax into its legislation system, as announced by Malaysia's Deputy Finance Minister, Dato' Wira Amiruddin Hamzah, in November 2018. The tax rate was initially set at 6% and came into effect on 1 January 2020. Under the new regulations, foreign service providers are required to register with The Royal Malaysian Customs Department and pay taxes on a quarterly basis if the total value of digital services provided to Malaysian consumers exceeds RM500,000. As of July 2021, over 300 foreign service providers from various countries have registered, including prominent search engine companies, online game and software developers, leading online advertising platform providers, and Internet telecommunications companies. This new tax had generated nearly RM428 million in revenue for the Malaysian government in 2020.

At the end of 2023, the Malaysian Ministry of Finance amended the law to increase the tax rate to 8%, effect from March 1, 2024.

=== Indonesia ===
Starting from July 2020, Indonesia imposes a 10% value-added tax (VAT) on intangible foreign goods and services transacted through electronic systems. Foreign suppliers engaged in e-commerce activities or providing application services through digital channels will be designated as VAT collectors by the Ministry of Finance. These designated VAT collectors are required to report and remit the VAT collected on a quarterly basis. The VAT applies to digital goods such as software, multimedia, and electronic data, as well as digital services like web hosting, video conferencing, and other services paid for using Indonesian payment facilities, IP addresses, or phone numbers.

This new tax applies only to individuals or entities that exceed certain transaction amounts or user thresholds.

- the total value of transactions conducted with Indonesian customers surpasses IDR 600 million ($40,300) annually or IDR 50 million monthly; OR
- there are 12,000 visits from Indonesian users to their platform within a year, or 1,000 visits in a single month.

As of September 2020, two months after the tax came into effective, the Directorate General of Taxes (DGT) announced the designation of 28 entities as VAT collectors. These include prominent global technology companies such as Amazon, Google, Netflix, Spotify, LinkedIn, Microsoft, Facebook, Zoom, Twitter, Skype, and others.

=== Philippines ===
In the Philippines, a new law concerning the taxation of digital goods and services was enacted. On October 2, 2024, President Bongbong Marcos signed the VAT on Digital Services Act (Republic Act No. 12023), which imposes a 12% Value Added Tax (VAT) on digital services provided by non-resident digital service providers (DSPs) to Filipino consumers. This law aims to modernize the tax system and ensure that foreign digital platforms contribute to the Philippine economy, even without having a physical presence in the country.

=== Thailand ===
Thailand is the last of the three South-east Asia countries that introduced plan to impose tax on digital goods. It was introduced in report released in April 2019 stating that it will aim at taxing the digital platform operators and joint with e-payment law prevent tax evasion of local online platform operators. It is also planned to come in effect at the beginning of 2020.

=== Taiwan ===
In Taiwan, the digital service tax applies to foreign companies providing digital services to individuals in Taiwan. The standard VAT rate for digital services supplied by foreign companies to Taiwanese consumers is 5%. Foreign companies are required to register for VAT with the local tax authorities when their annual sales exceed TWD 480,000. This rule came into effect on May 1, 2017.

== South America ==
=== Chile ===
Chile introduced a digital tax as part of its tax reform in August 2018. The tax rate was revealed to be at 10% by Chile's finance minister Felipe Larrain. However, this proposal was withdrawn and is now subject to review.

=== Colombia ===
Since July 2018 all foreign suppliers have a liability of collecting and paying 19% VAT from sales to individuals in Colombia. Online platforms operating strictly on B2B (business to business) are not subject of this taxation.

=== Uruguay ===
In Uruguay the first idea of taxing the digital services from foreign suppliers appeared in 2015. As in Colombia the law regarding digital tax has come in effect in July 2018 being set at 22% as considered as VAT. As in most cases one of the main reasons was to make local suppliers competitive. It is estimated that this new VAT can bring US$10 million per year into Uruguay treasury.

=== Brazil ===
The first plan to implement digital tax in Brazil was revealed in October 2017. On 15 March 2018, São Paulo State Court decided in favour of Association of Information and Communication Technology Companies (Brasscom) and so the effects of the digital tax were suspended on software streaming and downloading.

=== Argentina ===
A digital tax in Argentina was announced in October 2017. It was specified that non-residents supplying digital services to customers in Argentina will be taxed 21% rate. The law is effective since June 2018. Argentina has a unique approach to collecting this tax. Usually, the collecting and remittance of VAT is liability of the non-resident supplier; in Argentina the tax is charged through the customers' credit cards used to pay for online services.

== Africa ==
The African Tax Administration Forum (ATAF) published a paper in September 2020 on the Suggested Approach to Drafting Digital Services Tax Legislation, which includes a model DST law.

=== Kenya ===
Kenya's DST, effective from January 1, 2021, currently does not have an application threshold. It applies also to a broad variety of digital services including online education services, thus potentially affecting higher education institutions.

== See also ==
- Internet Tax Freedom Act
- Internet taxes
- Tariff engineering
- Taxation in the United States
