= Tax-free =

Tax-free may refer to:

- Duty-free shop
- Tax-free shopping
- Tax exemption
- "Tax Free", a song by Joni Mitchell from her 1985 album Dog Eat Dog (Joni Mitchell album)
