= ITFA =

ITFA may refer to:

- Internet Tax Freedom Act, a United States federal law
- International Tamil Film Awards
