= Internet Tax Nondiscrimination Act =

US federal Law

The Internet Tax Nondiscrimination Act was a U.S. federal law that banned Internet taxes in the United States. Signed into law on December 3, 2004, by George W. Bush, it extended until 2007 the then-current moratorium on new and discriminatory taxes on the Internet. It also extended the federal prohibition against state and local Internet access taxes until November 2007.

The law's primary supporters were Representative Christopher Cox (R-California) and Senator Ron Wyden (D-Oregon), as well as Senator George Allen (R-Virginia).

The law was supported by a congressionally sponsored study commission known as the Advisory Commission on Electronic Commerce, which studied Internet taxes in 1999 and 2000. The Commission was chaired by then-Virginia Governor James S. Gilmore, III, who led a coalition of Commission members to issue a final report opposing taxation of the Internet and eliminating federal telephone taxes, among other ideas.

On November 1, 2007, President Bush signed the "Internet Tax Freedom Act Amendment Act of 2007" into law. It extended the prohibitions against multiple and discriminatory taxes on electronic commerce until November 1, 2014. See 47 United States Code Section 151.

== See also ==
- Internet Tax Freedom Act
