= Colony Brands =

American retail company

Colony Brands, Inc.
- Formerly: The Swiss Colony
- Founded: 1926; 100 years ago, in Monroe, Wisconsin
- Founder: Ray Kubly
- Headquarters: Monroe, Wisconsin
- Brands: Montgomery Ward; AmeriMark Direct; Midnight Velvet; Seventh Avenue; Monroe & Main; Ginny's; The Swiss Colony; Country Door; The Tender Filet; Ashro; The Wisconsin Cheeseman; Bwell Now
- Subsidiaries: SC Global Sourcing; SC Data Center; CB1 Collections; DM Services; Green County Foods; Integrated Marketing Solutions (IMS); SC Aviation; SC Contact Centers; Swiss Colony Retail Brands
- Website: www.colonybrands.com

Colony Brands, Inc. (formerly, The Swiss Colony, Inc.) is a mail-order and online retail company known for its cheese, sausage, chocolate, fruitcakes, and other food products. The company also features extensive offerings in furniture, home decor, apparel, entertainment products, and electronics. It is one of the largest direct marketers in the United States.

== History ==
The company was founded in 1926 in Monroe, Wisconsin, a town with a strong concentration of Swiss immigrants and a storied history of cheese production. Ray Kubly, then a senior at the University of Wisconsin–Madison, completed a project for one of his classes by analyzing the business case for selling Green County cheese via mail order. Following graduation, Ray decided to pursue the venture and commenced operations from his family's basement. In the first year of operation, only 50 orders of cheese were shipped. The company grew steadily over time and attracted regional and national recognition. Sausage as well as bakery products and confections were added to the company's offerings. The company made its first entry into non-food merchandising in 1982.

Colony Brands, Inc. and its affiliated companies now employ more than 4,500 people. Approximately 50% of these individuals work on a temporary basis during peak operations in fall and holiday seasons.

In recognition of its strong roots in southern Wisconsin, the company sponsors the Swiss Colony Cheese Days Parade in Green County, Wisconsin, every September in even numbered years.

The company changed its name from The Swiss Colony, Inc. to Colony Brands, Inc. on June 1, 2010, in an effort to "better reflect its position as a parent company for our extensive portfolio of food and non-food catalogs, internet and subsidiaries."

On June 16, 2023, Colony Brands acquired some of AmeriMark's assets, adding 12 additional brands to Colony Brands.

== Brands ==
In addition to its namesake Swiss Colony brand, Colony Brands, Inc. operates catalog businesses under numerous names.

In August 2008, a Swiss Colony subsidiary purchased the assets of bankrupt retailer Direct Marketing Services Inc., giving Swiss Colony control of DMSI's direct-mail brands:

- Montgomery Ward (general merchandise)
- AmeriMark Direct (general merchandise)
- Charles Keath (home decor)
- Home Visions (bedding, furniture, home décor)

Colony Brands owns many different catalog companies, including Ashro, Montgomery Ward, AmeriMark, The Swiss Colony, Wisconsin Cheeseman, Midnight Velvet, Ginny's, Monroe and Main, Country Door, Tender Filet, and Seventh Avenue, the latter of which is considered their flagship catalog.

Colony Brands, Inc. also maintains a controlling interest in Janesville, Wisconsin-based SC Aviation, Inc., a provider of aircraft charter and management services.

== Facilities ==
Colony Brands, Inc. has been headquartered in Monroe, Wisconsin, since its inception and concentrates its operations in the upper midwest US. Primary facilities are located in:

- Monroe, Wisconsin - Corporate headquarters; SC Data Center, Inc.; Integrated Marketing Solutions, Inc.; DM Services, Inc.; Green County Foods, Inc.; SC Global Sourcing, Inc.
- Madison, Wisconsin
- Sun Prairie, Wisconsin
- Janesville, Wisconsin - SC Aviation, Inc.
- Westmont, Illinois
- Clinton, Iowa
- Davenport, Iowa
- Peosta, Iowa - Colony Brands, Inc. (order fulfillment)
- Hannibal, Missouri - SC Data Center, Inc. (customer service and order taking - closed 5/31/23)

During the 1960s and 1970s, The Swiss Colony became known for a network of retail stores in shopping malls throughout the US, growing to more than 225 locations. The company made a strategic decision to end these operations in the early 1980s, to focus on catalog operations. This was due to an economic downturn and the high cost of space in suitable shopping centers. The company maintains outlet stores in Monroe, Wisconsin, and Davenport, Iowa.

== Leadership ==
Pat Kubly assumed leadership of the company from his father, founder Ray Kubly, in 1969. He currently serves as chairman of the board. Colony Brands, Inc. president Bob Erb is in charge of day-to-day operations. Ray Kubly's grandson, Ryan Kubly, is the director of strategic planning.
