= Permanent Internet Tax Freedom Act =

- Long title: To permanently extend the Internet Tax Freedom Act.
- Announced in: the 113th United States Congress
- Sponsored by: Rep. Bob Goodlatte (R, VA-6)
- Number of co-sponsors: 4

Codification
- Acts affected: Internet Tax Freedom Act
- U.S.C. sections affected: 47 U.S.C. § 151

Legislative history
- Introduced in the House as H.R. 3086 by Rep. Bob Goodlatte (R, VA-6) on September 12, 2013; Committee consideration by United States House Committee on the Judiciary, United States House Judiciary Subcommittee on Regulatory Reform, Commercial and Antitrust Law; Passed the House on July 15, 2014 (voice vote)

The Permanent Internet Tax Freedom Act (H.R. 3086) is a bill that would amend the Internet Tax Freedom Act to make permanent the ban on state and local taxation of Internet access and on multiple or discriminatory taxes on electronic commerce.

The bill was introduced and passed in the United States House of Representatives during the 113th United States Congress.

== Background ==
The Internet Tax Freedom Act first became law in 1998 and has had to be reauthorized several times since then. The bill was originally passed to help protect the newly developing technology. Without another renewal or permanent change, the measure would expire on December 31, 2014.

== Provisions of the bill ==
The Permanent Internet Tax Freedom Act would amend the Internet Tax Freedom Act to make permanent the ban on state and local taxation of Internet access and on multiple or discriminatory taxes on electronic commerce.

== Congressional Budget Office report ==
H.R. 3086 would make permanent a moratorium on state and local taxes on Internet access and some taxes on electronic commerce. Under current law, the moratorium was set to expire on November 1, 2014. The Congressional Budget Office (CBO) estimated that enacting H.R. 3086 would have no impact on the federal budget, but beginning in 2014, it would impose significant annual costs on some state and local governments. The bill would not affect federal direct spending or revenues; therefore, pay-as-you-go procedures did not apply.

By permanently prohibiting state and local government from collecting certain types of taxes, H.R. 3086 would impose an intergovernmental mandate as defined in the Unfunded Mandates Reform Act (UMRA). CBO estimated that the mandate would cause some state and local governments to lose revenue beginning in November 2014; those losses would exceed the threshold established in UMRA for intergovernmental mandates ($76 million in 2014, adjusted annually for inflation) beginning in 2015. CBO estimated that the direct costs to states and local governments would probably total more than several hundred million dollars annually. The bill contains no private-sector mandates as defined in UMRA.

== Procedural history ==
The Permanent Internet Tax Freedom Act was introduced into the United States House of Representatives on September 12, 2013 by Rep. Bob Goodlatte (R, VA-6). The bill was referred to the United States House Committee on the Judiciary and the United States House Judiciary Subcommittee on Regulatory Reform, Commercial and Antitrust Law. On July 3, 2014, it was reported alongside House Report 113-510. On July 15, 2014, the House voted in a voice vote to pass the bill.

A companion bill, the S.431, the Internet Tax Freedom Forever Act, was read in the Senate but not passed. Eventually, the measure was tacked onto the Trade Facilitation and Trade Enforcement Act of 2015, which passed the Senate by a vote of 75 to 20. That Act was signed into law on February 24, 2016.

== Debate and discussion ==
The bill would end a grandfather clause in the original Internet Tax Freedom Act that allowed states and localities to keep charging an internet sales tax if they had already been doing so in 1998. This bill would end that grandfather clause, resulting in a handful of states losing about $500 million a year in combined taxes. Those states are Hawaii, New Mexico, North Dakota, Ohio, South Dakota, Texas, and Wisconsin. Rep. Goodlatte responded to the criticism of the removal of the grandfather clause by arguing that the clause was only meant to be temporary, allowing those states to find other sources of revenue, and that 16 years has been "time enough to change their tax code."

Rep. Bob Goodlatte (R-VA) wrote an op-ed in The Hill arguing strongly in favor of the bill. Goodlatte said that in "our new digital economy" a "computer and internet access serve as a gateway - if not a necessity - for the American Dream. Millions of Americans now rely on the internet to run their businesses, to educate themselves, to seek new opportunities, to research and write, and to communicate with family and friends." According to Goodlatte, the bill was necessary to protect the American people and their ability to access the internet from the high monetary barriers that would be created if states were allowed to tax internet access. Goodlatte later said that "this legislation prevents a surprise tax hike on Americans' critical services this fall."

The Center on Budget and Policy Priorities criticized the legislation, calling it "harmful" and claiming that it "would cost states up to $7 billion in potential annual revenue."

Some Democrats criticized the bill, arguing that the internet no longer needs tax protection, that more people do not use the internet in untaxed states versus taxed states, and that the bill infringes on states' rights. According to one commentator, the argument about whether this bill is an example of federal overreach "puts many politicians into a quandary by forcing them to take a stance on which they hate more: taxes or the federal government telling states what to do."

This bill does not deal with internet sales tax, the taxing of goods bought and sold over the internet.

== See also ==
- List of bills in the 113th United States Congress
- Marketplace Fairness Act
