= Miller Bros. Co. v. Maryland =

Miller Brothers Co. v. Maryland
- Supreme Court of the United States

Argued January 5, 1954 Decided April 5, 1954
- Full case name: Miller Brothers Co. v. Maryland
- Citations: 347 U.S. 340 (more) 74 S. Ct. 535; 98 L. Ed. 2d 744; 1954 U.S. LEXIS 2277

Case history
- Prior: Miller Brothers Co. v. State, 201 Md. 535, 95 A.2d 286 (1953); probable jurisdiction noted, Miller Bros. v. Maryland, 346 U.S. 809 (1953).

Court membership
- Chief Justice Earl Warren Associate Justices Hugo Black · Stanley F. Reed; Felix Frankfurter · William O. Douglas; Robert H. Jackson · Harold H. Burton; Tom C. Clark · Sherman Minton

Case opinions
- Majority: Jackson, joined by Reed, Frankfurter, Burton, Minton
- Dissent: Douglas, joined by Warren, Black, Clark

Miller Brothers Co. v. Maryland, 347 U.S. 340 (1954) was a decision by the U.S. Supreme Court that ruled 5-4 that a mail order reseller was not required to collect a use tax unless it had sufficient contact with the state.

== Background ==
Miller Brothers Co. was a store in the state of Delaware that sold merchandise to consumers. It did not accept phone or mail orders, but it solicited and advertised via newspaper, mail, and radio in Delaware. Some of the advertisements would reach Maryland residents, who would sometimes come to the store, make purchases and then return to Maryland. The customers would either take their purchases with them or have them delivered by a common carrier or a truck, owned and operated by Miller Brothers Co.

Maryland levied a tax on its residents on "the use, storage, or consumption" of articles within the state and also required all vendors, regardless of where they were, who sold goods to Maryland residents to collect the use tax. Miller Brothers Co. did not collect it. When the Miller Brothers Co. truck entered Maryland to make a delivery, the state of Maryland seized it.

The Court of Appeals of Maryland found the law valid and that Miller Brothers Co. was liable for the tax. Miller Brothers Co. appealed.

Maryland's tax was a use tax; a 1944 Supreme Court case, McLeod v. J.E. Dilworth Co., had ruled that a state could not levy a sales tax on sales made by a merchant in another state.

== Decision ==
The Supreme Court held that imposing tax collection duties on Miller Brothers Co. violated the Due Process Clause of the 14th Amendment, which requires some "definite link, some minimum connection, between a state and the person, property, or transaction it seeks to tax." Residence within the state, doing business or hiring of employees within the state, or the owning of property within the state would all qualify as such a connection.

None of Miller Brothers' activities rose to that level. Maryland residents had to come physically to the Delaware store. Miller Brothers' only contact with Maryland was through "the incidental effects of general advertising." As a result, "the burden of collecting or paying their tax cannot be shifted to a foreign merchant in the absence of some jurisdictional basis not present here." The residents of Maryland were, however, still liable for the use tax, but Miller Brothers Co. was not responsible for collecting it.

== See also ==
- National Bellas Hess v. Illinois (1967)
- Direct Marketing Ass'n v. Brohl (2015)
- South Dakota v. Wayfair, Inc. (2018)
