= Internet Tax Freedom Act =

The 1998 Internet Tax Freedom Act is a United States law authored by Representative Christopher Cox and Senator Ron Wyden that established national policy regarding federal and state taxation of the internet, based upon its unique characteristics as a mode of interstate and global commerce uniquely susceptible to multiple and discriminatory taxation. The law prohibits states and their local governments from imposing taxes directly on the internet or online activity, such as email taxes, internet access taxes, bit taxes, and bandwidth taxes. It categorizes taxes targeted specifically to the internet itself or to online commerce as “discriminatory.” Discriminatory taxes are outlawed.

When it was originally signed into law as Title XI of Pub.L. 105-277 on October 21, 1998, by President Bill Clinton, the Act imposed a ten-year moratorium on discriminatory and multiple taxation of the internet and electronic commerce. The law was subsequently extended on multiple occasions by Congress, and on February 24, 2016, it was made permanent as Pub.L. 114–125, §922(a).

In both its original and permanent form, the law's stated purpose is to promote and preserve the commercial, educational, and informational potential of the Internet.

== Background ==
The technology of the internet was uniquely challenging to existing regulatory and tax paradigms when the World Wide Web emerged in the 1990s. Its decentralized, packet-switched architecture, which could route even the simplest messages through servers in multiple cities, counties, and states, exposed the medium to potential taxation across a confusing patchwork of thousands of U.S. state and local taxing jurisdictions. Municipalities had taxed and regulated cable television as if it were a public utility, and they saw the internet as no different. The United Nations was studying the idea of a global email tax.

In Congress and the White House, preserving the uniquely national and global characteristics of the internet featured more prominently in policy making. In a white paper entitled “The Framework for Global Electronic Commerce,” the White House pointed to “the Internet’s special characteristics” as reason for its concern “about possible moves by state and local tax authorities to target electronic commerce.” The specter of multiple states and municipalities all simultaneously taxing and regulating commerce on the internet was seen as the far greater concern. Congress believed the increase in GDP facilitated by internet commerce would boost state revenues, not cut them.

== Legislative history ==
On March 13, 1997, Representative Cox introduced H.R. 1054, titled the “Internet Tax Freedom Act,” in the U.S. House, and Senator Wyden introduced it in the Senate, where it was designated S. 442. The bill received hearings in both chambers. Cox introduced two updated versions: H.R. 3849, in May 1998; and H.R. 4105, in June 1998, the latter of which passed the U.S. House unanimously in July 1998. Three months later, in October 1998, the Senate passed the companion bill, S. 442, by a vote of 96–2.

The Internet Tax Freedom Act was then added to the omnibus appropriations bill for that year, and signed into law by President Clinton as Titles XI and XII of P.L. 105–277 on October 21, 1998. It is codified at 47 U.S.C. § 151, note.

Prior to the expiration of the law's original ten-year term, Congress extended the Act on multiple occasions. President Barack Obama signed one extension on September 19, 2014, until December 11, 2014; another on December 16, 2014, until October 1, 2015; and a third on September 30, 2015, which extended the Act through December 11, 2015.

Meanwhile, on July 15, 2014, the House passed H.R. 3086, the Permanent Internet Tax Freedom Act, designed to bring an end to the need for extensions by making the Internet Tax Freedom Act permanent. When the Senate took no action on the bill prior to the expiration of the 113th Congress, it was reintroduced as H.R. 235 in the 114th Congress, and the House unanimously approved it on June 9, 2015. The bill was then added to the Trade Facilitation and Trade Enforcement Act of 2015, which passed the House on December 11, 2015 and the Senate on February 11, 2016. President Obama signed it on February 24, 2016, finally making the Internet Tax Freedom Act permanent after nearly two decades.

== U.S. Supreme Court litigation ==
On June 21, 2018, the U.S. Supreme Court decided South Dakota v. Wayfair, Inc., a case addressing the constitutionality of a state's taxation of ecommerce sales when the seller does not have a physical presence in the state but the buyer lives in said state. In a 5–4 decision, the Court expressly overruled its prior precedent in Quill Corp. v. North Dakota in order to hold that states can tax citizens of other states if they are doing business over the internet. Under Quill and other prior decisions, some physical presence in the state had been required in order for a state to exercise its jurisdiction over nonresidents.

Because the internet reaches into every state, the effect of the Wayfair decision was to expose any person operating a business in a single state to the conflicting sales and use tax rules of thousands of taxing jurisdictions, so long as the business sells via a website — a result the Internet Tax Freedom Act had been meant to avoid. By deciding the case exclusively on constitutional grounds, the Court avoided the statutory issue, but impliedly determined that the Act does not include extraterritorial sales taxes on digital commerce within its definition of banned discriminatory taxes.

== See also ==
- Internet taxes
- Taxation of Digital Goods
- Marketplace Fairness Act
