= American Commerce Marketing Association =

American industry association

- Abbreviation: ACMA
- Formation: 2007; 19 years ago
- Type: Nonprofit trade association
- Legal status: Active
- Purpose: Represent and advocate for print catalogers
- Location: Washington, DC, United States
- Region served: United States
- President: Mike Plunkett
- Vice President: Paul Miller
- Funding: Member fees
- Website: commercemarketing.org
- Formerly called: American Catalog Mailers Association

The American Commerce Marketing Association (ACMA), formerly American Catalog Mailers Association, is an American industry association that advocates for catalog marketers. It is a nonprofit organization organized under Internal Revenue Code Section 501(c)(6) and headquartered in Washington, D.C.

== History ==
The American Catalog Mailers Association was formed in 2007 following a large increase in postal rates for catalog mail. Many catalog mailers believed these rate increased were made because their interests were not represented in the political process.

Since its inception, the ACMA has had impact in two processes for setting postal rates, has testified before Congress and regulatory bodies, and has established relationships with the United States Postal Service, the Postal Regulatory Commission, and members of the House of Representative and the Senate and Congressional staff.

In 2024, the American Catalog Mailers Association officially changed its name to the American Commerce Marketing Association. It said this was to reflect the organization’s expanded mission beyond just catalog mail to encompass broader commerce marketing including e-commerce, omnichannel retail, and digital outreach.

== Focus ==
ACMA represents the interests of its members. These include:

- Postal rates, regulations and technical matters
- Environmental issues
- Privacy issues
- Remote sales tax collection
- Regulatory and congressional relations
- Innovative business oriented advances or external threats

== Membership ==
Membership is open to any party with significant interests in the catalog mailing industry. These include:

1. Multi-channel retailers for whom catalogs represents a significant sales channel, whether the demand is fulfilled via traditional mail order techniques, over the internet, or by generating traffic into brick and mortar retail stores.
2. Suppliers and service providers to multi-channel retailers including printers, paper mills and brokers, list providers, cooperative databases, modeling providers, creative agencies, consultants, among others.

== ACMA expertise ==
The ACMA has been called several times to testify before Congress on the impact of pending legislation. The media looks to the association for an understanding of how postal changes may affect the marketplace.
