= South Dakota v. Wayfair, Inc. =

- Supreme Court of the United States

Argued April 17, 2018 Decided June 21, 2018
- Full case name: South Dakota v. Wayfair, Inc., Overstock.com, Inc., and Newegg, Inc.
- Docket no.: 17-494
- Citations: 585 U.S. 162 (more) 138 S. Ct. 2080; 201 L. Ed. 2d 403

Case history
- Prior: State v. Wayfair, Inc., No. 32CIV16-000092 (S.D. 6th Cir. March 6, 2017); affirmed, 2017 S.D. 56, 901 N.W.2d 754; cert. granted, 138 S. Ct. 735 (2018).

Holding
- The physical presence rule is rejected as unsound and incorrect. States may charge sales tax on out-of-state purchases even if the seller does not have a physical presence in the taxing state.

Court membership
- Chief Justice John Roberts Associate Justices Anthony Kennedy · Clarence Thomas; Ruth Bader Ginsburg · Stephen Breyer; Samuel Alito · Sonia Sotomayor; Elena Kagan · Neil Gorsuch

Case opinions
- Majority: Kennedy, joined by Thomas, Ginsburg, Alito, Gorsuch
- Concurrence: Thomas
- Concurrence: Gorsuch
- Dissent: Roberts, joined by Breyer, Sotomayor, Kagan

Laws applied
- Dormant Commerce Clause
- This case overturned a previous ruling or rulings
- National Bellas Hess v. Illinois (1967), Quill Corp. v. North Dakota (1992)

South Dakota v. Wayfair, Inc., 585 U.S. 162 (2018), was a United States Supreme Court case that held by a 5–4 majority that states may charge tax on purchases made from out-of-state sellers even if the seller does not have a physical presence in the taxing state. The decision overturned Quill Corp. v. North Dakota (1992), which had held that the Dormant Commerce Clause barred states from compelling retailers to collect sales or use taxes in connection with mail order or Internet sales made to their residents unless those retailers have a physical presence in the taxing state.

Since Quill in 1992, the volume of interstate sales via electronic channels, particularly purchases from Internet vendors, has grown rapidly, and the Government Accountability Office has estimated that in 2017, states had lost over US$13 billion in taxes that they could not collect. Following a statement made in a concurrence opinion by Justice Anthony Kennedy in a 2015 related case, which suggested that it was time to review the decision of Quill in the wake of modern technology, more than 20 states passed "kill Quill" legislation intending to collect sales tax from out-of-state vendors and did so purposely to provide the necessary legal vehicle to take to the Supreme Court. South Dakota was the first state to make its case through lower courts to the Supreme Court.

The Supreme Court granted a writ of certiorari in January 2018, heard the case on April 17, 2018, and issued its decision on June 21, 2018. A five-justice majority overturned Quill by ruling that the physical presence rule decided from Quill was "unsound and incorrect" in the current age of Internet services.

== Background ==
=== Quill Corp. v. North Dakota ===
Quill Corp. v. North Dakota, 504 U.S. 298 (1992), was a Supreme Court case that determined that the Dormant Commerce Clause prohibited states from collecting sales taxes from purchases made by their residents from out-of-state vendors that did not have a physical presence within that state unless legislation from the United States Congress allowed them to do so. The Court's decision in Quill overruled parts of a previous Supreme Court case, National Bellas Hess v. Illinois 386 U.S. 753 (1967), which, until Quill, had prevented states from imposing a duty to collect on out-of-state vendors.

The decision effectively allowed Internet-driven e-commerce to be run tax-free in the United States. The Marketplace Fairness Act, which would have authorized states to collect these taxes, was introduced to the Congress several times (in 2011 and in 2013) and was passed by the Senate in 2013, but the bill failed to pass the House of Representatives amid opposition. Some states requested their citizens remit their out-of-state taxes voluntarily, but it is estimated a mere 1 to 2 percent of taxpayers complied. Amazon.com, one of the largest online vendors, had challenged states' demand to collect taxes but by 2017 was collecting taxes from purchasers in all 45 states with sales tax codes.

=== Direct Marketing Ass'n v. Brohl ===
In 2010, Colorado passed a law that required out-of-state vendors serving in-state residents to collect information related to sales to report back to the in-state residents, as a preamble for the state to then collect sales taxes on this information. The Direct Marketing Association (DMA, now known as the "Data & Marketing Association") filed a lawsuit against the state to overturn the law on the basis of Quill. The case was first heard at the U.S. District Court for Colorado in 2012, which had ruled in favor of the DMA. The state appealed to the U.S. Court of Appeals for the Tenth Circuit, which in 2013 ruled that the Tax Injunction Act prevented the lower federal court from having jurisdiction on the question of the constitutionality of Colorado's law and that the challenge should have been held at the state court level. The Tenth Circuit considered that the act of information gathering was not part of the tax-related activities that the Tax Injunction Act treats as interstate commerce and thus not a federal issue.

In addition to a separate challenge started at the state court level (Direct Marketing Ass'n v. Brohl II), the DMA challenged the Tenth Circuit ruling to the Supreme Court in 2015, Direct Marketing Ass'n v. Brohl, 575 U.S. 1 (2015). The Supreme Court ruled unanimously in March 2015 that the Tenth Circuit's rejection was improper; the act of collecting information requested by Colorado's law as a prerequisite to taxes is part of the expected part of a tax collection, making it an interstate commerce issue to be dealt at the federal level; and it was thus not an exception to Quill by the Tax Injunction Act. The Supreme Court remanded the case to the Tenth Circuit.

On rehearing, the Tenth Circuit found in favor of Colorado by holding that the state law "does not violate the dormant Commerce Clause because it does not discriminate against or unduly burden interstate commerce." The court reversed the district court's grant of summary judgment to the DMA and remanded the case to the district court for further proceedings. DMA filed a petition for a writ of certiorari in the Supreme Court (asking the court to hear the case), but the Court denied the petition in December 2016. By February 2017, the DMA and the state of Colorado had reached a settlement, with the DMA agreeing to drop the lawsuits in exchange for the state ignoring the penalty fees during the intervening years for non-compliance of the reporting requirements.

A key aspect of the Supreme Court's March 2015 decision in Direct Marketing Ass'n came from the concurrence of Justice Anthony Kennedy. Kennedy expressed concern on the "tenuous nature" of Quill and the "serious, continuing injustice faced by Colorado and many other States" of being able to collect sales taxes only from brick-and-mortar stores. He offered that "it is unwise to delay any longer a reconsideration of the Court's holding in Quill". In the concurrence, Kennedy reported that when Quill was decided, mail-order based sales were valued at about US$180 billion annually, but, by 2008, total e-commerce sales had reached US$3.16 trillion annually. While Kennedy urged to review Quill, he wrote that Direct Marketing Ass'n "does not raise this issue in a manner appropriate for the court to address it". Analysts took Kennedy's concurrence as a sign that Kennedy was inviting a new case to be brought to the Supreme Court for a review challenge of Quill.

=== South Dakota law ===
Partially based on Kennedy's concurrence in the 2015 case, South Dakota passed Senate Bill 106 in March 2016 with the intent of collecting sales tax from out-of-state vendors due to the state from purchases to be shipped into the state. The bill was one of the first so-called "kill Quill" bills, purposely made to challenge the Quill ruling based on the Direct Marketing Ass'n results. The proposed law established various safeguards for vendors and required only those with sales of over US$100,000 or with more than 200 different transactions shipped to addresses in the state to collect taxes. Furthermore, the law applied prospectively only, not retroactively, and included provisions whereby it would not take effect until a final court ruling on its constitutionality.

By April 2017, at least 20 other states had pending or enacted similar legislation designed to challenge Quill, including Alabama, Indiana, Tennessee, and Wyoming.

Prior to the law coming into force on May 1, 2016, the state sent out notices of lawsuit to four of the largest out-of-state vendors that the state believed would exceed the sales threshold and were not already collecting sales taxes: Wayfair, Overstock.com, Newegg, and Systemax. Of them, Systemax did not challenge the state and followed through with registering to collect sales tax for purchases made by South Dakota residents. The other three companies refused to comply, maintaining the decision from Quill. The state followed through with trial court, but the Sixth Judicial Circuit Court of South Dakota ruled that it was "duty bound" to follow the U.S. Supreme Court's decision of Quill. The state challenged that through the South Dakota Supreme Court, but the Court again could not act. Justice Glen A. Severson wrote in its unanimous September 2017 decision: "However persuasive the State's arguments on the merits of revisiting the issue, Quill has not been overruled."

== Supreme Court ==
The State of South Dakota determined that the only way it would be able to succeed in its lawsuit against the three companies was to ask the Supreme Court to abrogate the "sales-tax-only, physical-presence requirement" of Quill. The state filed its petition for a writ of certiorari on October 2, 2017. It was the first "kill-Quill" case to reach the U.S. Supreme Court. South Dakota recognized that it was not the only state seeking to abrogate Quill, but it was the furthest along in terms of legislation and litigation. Based on Kennedy's sense of urgency to review Quill from his concurrence in Direct Marketing Ass'n, it sought to have their case heard in the 2018 term.

In its petition, South Dakota cited three factors for abrogating Quill. In addition to citing the need for urgency from Kennedy, the state said:

- States, local brick-and-mortar stores, and interstate commerce were being harmed by the decision from Quill. The state pointed to a 2012 study from National Conference of State Legislatures that was performed through the University of Tennessee and estimated that states lost US$23 billion in potential revenue from collecting of sales taxes from out-of-state vendors, with the losses only worsening by the further increase in the use of online sales. The Government Accountability Office estimated this to be closer to US$13.7 billion in a 2017 audit. The state argued that its inability to collect sales taxes harms its ability to manage their government resources without raising other taxes and that in states wholly dependent on sales taxes for revenue (i.e. where there is no income tax), the effect becomes more pronounced. The state further stated that brick-and-mortar stores are discriminated against by Quill since online stores can offer the same products at lower effective prices, and doing interstate commerce for other venues is discouraged because of Quill.
- The "physical presence" aspect of the decision in Quill was flawed, particularly considering the four-pronged test for collection of interstate taxes defined previously in Complete Auto Transit, Inc. v. Brady 430 U.S. 274 (1977), as well as the new landscape of e-commerce in 2017 compared to 1992 that make the stare decisis factors of the Quill decision no longer applicable. The nature of the Internet makes a state's economic nexus, a term defined in Complete Auto Transit to describe taxable activities of interest to the state, much broader than it was in 1992. The state argued that while there may have been a burden for out-of-state vendors to determine the appropriate state and apply the correct sales tax in 1992, those processes in 2017 were readily available and no longer a burden on vendors.

The National Retail Federation, along with 40 other states, joined in South Dakota's petition. The state was also supported by President Donald Trump's administration. The state was represented at oral arguments by its Attorney General Marty J. Jackley and Deputy Solicitor General Malcolm L. Stewart.

Wayfair, Overstock.com, and Newegg filed a petition to deny writ. The three argued:

- South Dakota's appeal overlooked stare decisis of previous rulings, as well as that South Dakota's standard put a questionable burden on retailers to act as tax collectors for out-of-state purchases. "The system of state and local sales taxes in the United States is highly complex. There are 45 states, plus the District of Columbia, that have a sales tax, and thousands of local taxing jurisdictions. This dizzying array of jurisdictions results in thousands of different tax rates, taxable and exempt products and services, exempt purchasers, shipping tax treatment, specialized tax rules (such as sales tax "holidays" and "thresholds" for different products), statutory definitions, registration and reporting regimes, record keeping requirements, and filing systems. In addition to compliance burdens, companies are exposed to potential audit by every state and locality with a self-administered sales or use tax." Also, the number of taxing jurisdictions has continued to mushroom.
- The state's economic policy arguments are refuted by other sources. For example, "remote sellers have always operated at a fundamental cost disadvantage to local businesses, because remote sellers must charge (or absorb) shipping and handling fees in order to deliver their products to consumers. Such fees are almost invariably greater, as a percentage of the purchase price, than the sales tax."
- A fact-intensive review is required to overcome the restrictions of the Dormant Commerce Clause of the US Constitution, but the underlying case lacks those necessary facts.
- South Dakota's petition opens up every American business to the risk of retroactive tax liability.
- The companies also noted that at the time of their petition, there were at least three current bills in Congress that would either codify Quill or codify language contrary to Quill but otherwise following the Quill ruling that only Congress may enable states to collect tax on interstate purchases.

There were 23 other amicus curiae briefs that were filed to support the companies' position and included a joint bi-partisan petition of six US House and Senate members led by the Chair of The House Committee on the Judiciary Robert W. Goodlatte which argued for the Supreme Court "to deny the petition and leave it to Congress to pursue its fuller and more appropriate means of arriving at a solution". Others filing in opposition to the case included trade groups National Taxpayers Union Foundation, the American Catalog Mailers Association, Americans for Tax Reform and NetChoice, as well as other online retailers like eBay and Etsy. George Isaacson of Brann & Isaacson, who represented the plaintiffs in DMA, presented the oral arguments for the respondents for this case.

The Court agreed to hear the case in January 2018. Oral argument was heard on April 17, 2018.

== Opinion ==
The Supreme Court announced its judgment in favor of the state on June 21, 2018, vacating and remanding the case by a vote of 5–4.

=== Majority decision ===
The majority opinion, written by Kennedy and joined by Thomas, Alito, Ginsburg, and Gorsuch, determined that the physical-presence rule of Quill was "unsound and incorrect" and overruled it, along with National Bellas Hess v. Illinois, parts of which Quill had already overturned. The Court vacated the South Dakota Supreme Court's judgment and remanded the case back to that court. Kennedy wrote, "The Internet's prevalence and power have changed the dynamics of the national economy.". He noted that when Quill was decided, revenues for mail order products were around US$180 million and that e-commerce retail sales in 2017 were estimated at US$453.5 billion. Kennedy also criticized how some online retailers promoted their sales tax-free benefits without considering the impact and singled out Wayfair's marketing: "What Wayfair ignores in its subtle offer to assist in tax evasion is that creating a dream home assumes solvent state and local governments." Kennedy commented that the Court did not rule whether states could retroactively collect sales taxes in the immediate case but anticipated that would be an issue of consideration in the future.

=== Concurring opinions ===
Justice Thomas wrote a concurring opinion in which he compared his position to that of Justice Byron White, who had joined the majority in National Bellas Hess but years later had decided to rule against it during Quill. Thomas had similarly joined the majority supporting the Quill decision and had reconsidered his position in the intervening years as White had done with the ruling in South Dakota. Justice Gorsuch also wrote a concurring opinion that stated that still remained issues of the division of powers between Congress and states related to interstate commerce that will likely be raised in the future but that with its overturning, the Court's decision "rightly end the paradox of condemning interstate discrimination in the national economy while promoting it ourselves."

=== Dissenting opinion ===
Chief Justice John Roberts wrote the dissenting opinion, joined by Justices Stephen Breyer, Sonia Sotomayor, and Elena Kagan. Roberts agreed that past Court decisions in this area were "wrongly decided" because of the growth of e-commerce but believed that stare decisis weighed heavily against overruling Quill and that it should be left to Congress to enact legislation to override those previous decisions.

== Subsequent developments ==
In recognition of the fact that state nexus rules may overburden interstate commerce, states have begun implementing thresholds based on factors such as transaction numbers and receipts generated. As of December 2018, 31 different states have standing tax laws requiring taxation of Internet purchases, most following the model of the South Dakota to only collect tax from those vendors with more than 200 shipments into the state or exceeding $100,000 in revenues. Several of these new laws came into effect on January 1, 2019. A year from the decision, nearly all states that collected sales tax had modified their laws to include interstate commerce taxes; however, in many of these states, the updated laws did not include any threshold limits on when such taxes can be collected. Small to medium businesses may find the cost of auditing their sales for each state to far outweigh the amount of tax actually owed and forgo the process; and similarly, states looking to collect these taxes may find the cost of prosecuting against the smaller business to outweigh the benefit. It is expected that a raft of lawsuits related to these new tax laws from South Dakota will occur from 2019 through 2023.

== Economic impact ==
A 2022 study published in the Journal of Public Economics found that the Wayfair decision "increased sales tax revenues by 7.9 percent, concentrated in states with stringent compliance standards. With barcode-level scanner data, we find evidence of full pass-through of the tax to consumers. Effects are progressive however, with the reforms increasing tax liabilities principally for higher-income households."

According to a 2023 study, the case "greatly improved state governments' ability to enforce collection of sales taxes on a destination basis." The study also explored "the extent to which greater destination taxation has influenced the location of (a) consumer purchases and (b) business locations using two different empirical approaches. First, we analyze county-level data for Tennessee and select surrounding states to provide suggestive evidence that sales tax collections have grown more in rural Tennessee counties and less in Tennessee border counties since Wayfair. Additionally, we show that collections have grown more since Wayfair in North Carolina counties along the Tennessee border, where the tax rate differential is on the order of three percentage points. Second, we examine state-level data to show that business applications have grown at much faster rates after Wayfair in states with the highest sales tax rates. We attribute this to the removal of the significant disincentive to establish sales tax nexus that dominated the pre-Wayfair environment."

== See also ==
- Miller Bros. Co. v. Maryland (1954)
