= National Bellas Hess v. Illinois =

- Supreme Court of the United States

Argued February 23, 1967 Decided May 8, 1967
- Full case name: National Bellas Hess v. Department of Revenue of Illinois
- Citations: 386 U.S. 753 (more) 87 S. Ct. 1389; 18 L. Ed. 2d 505; 1967 U.S. LEXIS 2792

Holding
- The Commerce Clause prohibited a State from imposing the duty of use tax collection and payment upon a seller whose only connection with customers in the State is by common carrier or by mail.

Court membership
- Chief Justice Earl Warren Associate Justices Hugo Black · William O. Douglas; Tom C. Clark · John M. Harlan II; William J. Brennan Jr. · Potter Stewart; Byron White · Abe Fortas

Case opinions
- Majority: Stewart, joined by Warren, Clark, Harlan, Brennan, White
- Dissent: Fortas, joined by Black, Douglas
- Overruled by
- Quill Corp. v. North Dakota (1992) (in part), South Dakota v. Wayfair, Inc. (2018)

National Bellas Hess v. Department of Revenue of Illinois, 386 U.S. 753 (1967), is a United States Supreme Court case holding that a mail order reseller was not required to collect sales tax unless it had some physical contact with the state.

== Background ==
National Bellas Hess was a mail order seller of various consumer products. Its principal place of business was in Missouri. It owned no tangible property in Illinois and had no sales outlets, representatives, telephone listing, or solicitors in that state. It did not advertise there by radio, television, billboards, or newspapers. It mailed catalogues to customers throughout the United States, including Illinois. Orders for merchandise were mailed to appellant's Missouri plant, and goods were sent to customers by mail or common carrier. The state of Illinois attempted to force National Bellas Hess to collect a use tax from its customers.

== Ruling ==
The Commerce Clause prohibits a state from imposing the duty of use tax collection and payment upon a seller whose only connection with customers in the state is by common carrier or by mail. The court stated that "the Court has never held that a State may impose the duty of use tax collection and payment upon a seller whose only connection with customers in the State is by common carrier or the United States mail." The opinion cited Miller Brothers Co. v. Maryland, 347 U.S. 340 (1954)

In 1992, the Supreme Court in Quill Corp. v. North Dakota (1992) issued an order overruling part of the case. The court held, "Thus, to the extent that this Court's decisions have indicated that the Clause requires a physical presence in a State, they are overruled." That case slightly distinguished itself from Bellas Hess by ruling that physical presence was not necessary for a state to impose a duty to collect under the Due Process Clause of the US Constitution, but physical presence was still necessary for a state's use tax on a foreign vendor under the Dormant Commerce Clause of the US Constitution. The Supreme Court noted that in determining whether a state tax falls within the confines of the Due Process Clause, the North Dakota Supreme Court had said that due to rulings that were made after Bellas Hess, such as Complete Auto Transit, Inc. v. Brady, the "relevant inquiry under the latter test was whether 'the state has provided some protection, opportunities, or benefit for which it can expect a return.'" The Court stated, "In this case, the Supreme Court of North Dakota declined to follow Bellas Hess because 'the tremendous social, economic, commercial, and legal innovations' of the past quarter-century have rendered its holding 'obsole[te].' ... we must either reverse the State Supreme Court or overrule Bellas Hess. While we agree with much of the state court's reasoning, we take the former course."

The entirety of National Bellas Hess was later overruled in South Dakota v. Wayfair, Inc. (2018).

== See also ==
- Direct Marketing Ass'n v. Brohl (2015)
