= Quill Corp. v. North Dakota =

- Supreme Court of the United States

Argued January 22, 1992 Decided May 26, 1992
- Full case name: Quill Corporation, Petitioner v. North Dakota by and through its Tax Commissioner, Heidi Heitkamp
- Citations: 504 U.S. 298 (more) 112 S. Ct. 1904; 119 L. Ed. 2d 91; 1992 U.S. LEXIS 3123; 60 U.S.L.W. 4423; 92 Cal. Daily Op. Service 4458; 92 Daily Journal DAR 7142; 6 Fla. L. Weekly Fed. S 269

Holding
- The lack of a physical nexus in a state is sufficient grounds to exempt a corporation from having to pay sales and use taxes to a state.

Court membership
- Chief Justice William Rehnquist Associate Justices Byron White · Harry Blackmun; John P. Stevens · Sandra Day O'Connor; Antonin Scalia · Anthony Kennedy; David Souter · Clarence Thomas

Case opinions
- Majority: Stevens, joined by unanimous court (parts I, II, III); Rehnquist, Blackmun, O'Connor, Souter (part IV)
- Concurrence: Scalia (in part and in judgment), joined by Kennedy, Thomas
- Concur/dissent: White

Laws applied
- U.S. Const. Art. I § 8
- Overruled by
- South Dakota v. Wayfair, Inc. (2018)
- This case overturned a previous ruling or rulings
- National Bellas Hess v. Illinois (1967) (in part)

Quill Corp. v. North Dakota, 504 U.S. 298 (1992), was a United States Supreme Court ruling, since overturned, concerning use tax. The decision effectively prevented states from collecting any sales tax from retail purchases made over the internet or other e-commerce route unless the seller had a physical presence in the state. The ruling was based on the Dormant Commerce Clause, preventing states from interfering with interstate commerce unless authorized by the United States Congress. The case resulted from an attempt by North Dakota seeking to collect sales tax on licensed computer software offered by the Quill Corporation, an office supply retailer with no North Dakota presence, that allowed users to place orders directly with Quill.

Quill modified an earlier court decision, National Bellas Hess, Inc. v. Department of Revenue of Illinois, which dealt with a state imposing the duty of use tax collection on a mail order reseller. The decision in Quill has been a point of contention for states as e-Commerce had grown greatly during the 21st century. Spurred by Justice Anthony Kennedy's concurrence in Direct Marketing Ass'n v. Brohl, which spoke to a review of Quill, several states passed "kill Quill" laws to bring such a review to the Supreme Court. In the first such challenge, South Dakota v. Wayfair, Inc., heard in the 2018 term, the Court found that the physical presence rule defined by Quill was "unsound and incorrect", and overturned both Quill and the remaining portions of National Bellas Hess.

== Background ==
The North Dakota Office of State Tax Commissioner attempted to require Quill Corporation to collect and pay use tax on sales shipped into the state. The North Dakota Supreme Court upheld the statute.

Quill Corporation, which is incorporated in Delaware, did not have a physical location in North Dakota. None of its workers were located there. Quill sold office equipment and stationery in North Dakota by using catalogs, flyers, advertisements in national periodicals, and telephone calls. Deliveries were made by post and common carrier from out-state-locations. Quill would have been required to pay back taxes for three years, had the ruling gone in favor of the State of North Dakota.

== Opinion of the Court ==
North Dakota argued that under due process, Quill Corporation had established a presence, as the floppy disks holding Quill's software provided to in-state customers were physically located in their state. The Supreme Court based its reasoning on analysis of the Commerce Clause rather than due process.

The Commerce Clause gives the federal government power to regulate interstate commerce and prohibits certain state actions, such as applying duties that interfere with trade among the states. In National Bellas Hess, Inc. v. Department of Revenue of Illinois, the Court had held that a business whose only contacts with the taxing state are by mail or by common carrier lacks the "substantial nexus" required under the Dormant Commerce Clause.

The Court concluded that Complete Auto Transit, Inc. v. Brady did not limit or undo the Bellas Hess rule. A corporation, the court ruled, may have the minimum contacts required by the due process clause and still fall short of the substantial nexus required by the Dormant Commerce Clause. The court noted that the bright-line rule of National Bellas Hess "furthers the ends" of the Dormant Commerce Clause. The Court thus reversed the decision of the North Dakota Supreme Court that required Quill Corporation to collect and remit "use" taxes on purchases made by customers from that state.

== Effect on taxation of online sales ==
In Quill Corp. v. North Dakota, the Supreme Court ruled that a business must have a physical presence in a state for that state to require the business to collect sales taxes. However, the Court explicitly stated that Congress can overrule the decision through legislation. There have been many attempts by politicians to change this decision through legislation. No bills have made it to law, however, because of the controversy surrounding this matter.

Amazon.com used this ruling to justify not charging sales tax on its online sales, which gave it a competitive advantage over retailers from 1995 until 2012, when pressure from states made Amazon collect sales tax in some of the states.

The soundness of the Quill decision has been questioned by legal scholars and judges in the twenty-first century as online sales have largely escaped taxation to the detriment of brick-and-mortar stores and state and local treasuries. In a related 2015 Supreme Court case Direct Marketing Ass'n v. Brohl, Justice Anthony Kennedy wrote in his concurrence that the Quill decision had a "tenuous nature", that there was "serious, continuing injustice faced by Colorado and many other States" of being able to collect sales taxes only from brick-and-mortar stores, and offered "it is unwise to delay any longer a reconsideration of the Court's holding in Quill". Kennedy's opinion suggested urgency for a case for the Supreme Court to review the Quill decision according to analysts. This led to several states to draft and purposely enact "kill Quill" laws to collect sales taxes for out-of-state purchases as to create the necessary legal vehicle to take to the Supreme Court. States which choose to collect sales taxes on online sales of retailers without a nexus often set minimum values and transactions, under which companies are not required to collect sales taxes.

South Dakota was the first state to complete its bill and establish the need for a Supreme Court judicial review. In October 2017, the state of South Dakota filed a petition for certiorari in the U.S. Supreme Court urging it to "abrogate Quill's sales-tax-only, physical-presence requirement". In the petition for certiorari, under the case name South Dakota v. Wayfair, Inc., South Dakota noted that advances in computer technology have made it easier to determine appropriate sales tax based on the purchaser's location and requiring such "poses a minimal obstacle" in an era where retailers can easily tailor their online marketing based on customers' IP addresses. South Dakota argued that Quill should be overturned and that the case satisfied the Supreme Court's criteria for declining to maintain its previous ruling under the doctrine of stare decisis. The Court agreed to hear the case in January 2018, with arguments heard in April 2018. The Court ruled in June 2018 on a 5–4 decision that the physical presence aspect of Quill was "unsound and incorrect" with the state of current technology, and overturned Quill along with the remaining parts of National Bellas Hess.

== See also ==
- Sales taxes in the United States
- Streamlined Sales Tax Project
