= Amazon tax avoidance =

Avoidance of tax payment by Amazon

The tax behaviors of the American corporation Amazon have been investigated in China, Germany, Mongolia, Sweden, South Korea, France, Japan, Ireland, Singapore, Luxembourg, Italy, Spain, United Kingdom, multiple states in the United States, and Portugal. According to a report released by Fair Tax Mark Amazon was described as the leading actor in tax avoidance, having paid an effective tax rate of 12% between 2010 and 2018, compared with the US corporate tax rate of 35% during the same period. Amazon countered that it had an 24% effective tax rate during the same period. The Fair Tax Foundation released a follow-up report in 2025, which again described Amazon as "the worst".

== Background ==
Proponents of forcing Amazon.com to collect sales tax—at least in states where it maintains a physical presence—argue the corporation wields an anti-competitive advantage over storefront businesses forced to collect sales tax. Amazon is under increasing legal and political pressure from state governments, traditional retailers and other groups because of its refusal to collect sales tax in 41 of the 45 states with a statewide sales tax (as of March 2017). Those states include several where Amazon has a clear physical presence via distribution centers and wholly owned subsidiaries.

Amazon says it would support a federal solution to the sales tax problem as long as such legislation was fair and simple. As of May 2011 legislation has been introduced in Congress to allow states to impose sales taxes on sales to their residents from out-of-state. Amazon has not stated a public position on the bill. Amazon's competitors say it is insincere. Similar legislation, called the Main Street Fairness Act, failed in committee in 2010. Several earlier versions of the bill also failed to advance. Amazon lobbyists met four times with members of Congress or their aides in 2010 regarding the Main Street Fairness Act. The company spent $100,000 on lobbying in 2010, although these expenses also covered other bills discussed at the same time. Amazon has increased political contributions to federal lawmakers. Amazon's political action committee spent $214,000 during the 2010 election cycle, double what it spent for the 2008 elections.

== US legislation ==
Many U.S. states have passed online shopping sales tax laws designed to compel Amazon.com and other e-commerce retailers to collect state and local sales taxes from their customers. Amazon.com originally collected sales tax only from five states as of 2011, but as of April 2017 collects sales taxes from customers in all 45 states that have a state sales tax and in Washington, D.C. Amazon also collects sales tax on orders delivered to customers in specific localities in Alaska as well as certain textbook rentals sent to customers in Delaware.

Amazon does not collect sales taxes from Montana, New Hampshire, and Oregon, since those states do not have state sales taxes. Additionally, approximately half of all Amazon.com purchases are sold on the Amazon Marketplace through 3rd-party vendors, and these purchases remain free of tax except for in Washington state, where these purchases (starting in 2018) are now taxed.

The practice of not collecting sales tax on purchases due to lack of a physical presence ended in 2018. On April 17, 2018, The United States Supreme Court heard the case of South Dakota v. Wayfair, Inc., and issued its decision on June 21, 2018. A five-justice majority overturned Quill Corp. v. North Dakota, ruling that the physical presence rule decided in Quill was "unsound and incorrect" in the current age of Internet services.

Alabama's law also allows them to lock in the 8 percent rate even if the federal government adopts a higher figure in the future. The tax applies to all sales regardless of where they are shipped in the state. Furthermore, if sellers paid on time, they would be able to keep 2% and only remit 6% to Alabama. As a condition of joining the program, sellers agree to maintain records of all sales into Alabama, including purchaser name and address as well as purchase amount and taxes collected. Then, on January 1, 2016, new rules promulgated by the Alabama Department of Revenue required any out-of-state sellers doing more than $250,000 in sales to Alabama residents would be required to collect sales tax. This appears to be in contradiction to Quill Corp. v. North Dakota.

As of November 1, 2016, Amazon started collecting state sales tax by participating in Alabama's Simplified Use Tax Remittance Program, joining over 50 other retailers that had joined the program.

=== Alaska ===
Amazon does not collect a statewide sales tax. As of January 1, 2019, Amazon collects local sales tax for orders delivered to specific localities within the state.

=== Arizona ===
On October 26, 2012, Amazon reached an agreement with the Arizona Department of Revenue to pay $53 million to settle unpaid sales taxes. Furthermore, effective February 1, 2013, Amazon agreed to begin collecting sales taxes for goods sold to Arizonans. Furthermore, on July 1, 2013, Amazon would also begin collecting sales tax on digital products or services, like books. Amazon only agreed to collect the 6.6% state sales tax, but there was no requirement to collect local sales taxes, which can bring total tax close to 10%. This was an agreement between Amazon and Arizona, which mainly centered on Amazon's tax obligations because it maintains warehouses in Arizona. Arizona does not have a state law forcing other online retailers to collect sales tax if they do not have a physical nexus in Arizona.

=== Arkansas ===
In 2011, Arkansas passed a bill requiring Amazon to collect sales tax. The bill took advantage of Amazon's use of affiliates based in Arkansas to establish the necessary physical nexus. Amazon responded by terminating the contracts of its Arkansas-based affiliates effective July 24, 2011. As of March 1, 2017, Amazon will be charging Arkansas residents sales tax after legislation was being moved to collect sales taxes from online retailers. Whether Amazon collects local sales taxes is unclear. Arkansas is currently considering two bills that would require online retailers to collect sales tax (SB 140) or notify Arkansas residents that they owe sales taxes to the Arkansas government (HB 1388).

In April 2017, Amazon began collecting sales tax in the state.

=== California ===
In 2009, California representative Nancy Skinner pushed legislation to tax online sales that was approved as part of the state budget. Gov. Arnold Schwarzenegger vetoed the legislation. On January 19, 2011, Skinner introduced similar legislation in the form of AB153 that later became law. The bill required out-of-state online sellers with affiliates in California to collect sales tax on purchases made by state residents. The affiliate provision was included to ensure that only sellers with a California nexus are taxed, as required by federal law. "This legislation will close the current loophole in tax law that has allowed out-of-state companies to avoid collecting California sales and use tax," stated Skinner. Skinner estimated that AB153 could produce between $250 million and $500 million per year in new revenue. She and other supporters of the bill believe that the election of Jerry Brown to the governorship and support from retailers such as Barnes & Noble will help the measure become law.

In 2011, Amazon threatened to terminate roughly 10,000 of its affiliates located in California if legislation pending in the state legislature to deem such affiliates as constituting a nexus that requires the collection of sales tax is passed. California affiliates would no longer receive commissions on referrals to Amazon. As of March 2011, four bills are pending in the state legislature that would define the use of associates located in California-* for sales referrals as activity subject to taxation by California. In a letter addressed to California's Board of Equalization, the agency responsible for collecting sales taxes, Amazon called such legislation "unconstitutional" and said it would terminate its California affiliates if passed. "If any of these new tax collection schemes were adopted, Amazon would be compelled to end its advertising relationships with well over 10,000 California-based participants in the Amazon 'Associates Program,'" wrote Paul Misener, Amazon's vice president for Global Public Policy.

Responding to Amazon, Nancy Skinner said, "This is really about e-fairness. It's really to be fair and show our California Businesses that we're not hanging them out to dry." According to the American Independent Business Alliance, the corporation has operations in at least seven California cities and should be forced to collect sales tax regardless of its threats.

In July 2011, Amazon made good on its promises to terminate California affiliates. According to the Performance Marketing Association, there were 25,000 Amazon affiliates based in California. However, on Amazon's website, under "United States Subsidiaries," listed are four California locations for A2Z Development Center Inc. - "an innovative customer-centric software development company" - including in San Francisco and Cupertino, where the Kindle was designed; a search engine company called A9.com in Palo Alto; and, in San Francisco, Alexa Internet, another Amazon search company.

Due to its opposition to rules that would require the company to collect sales tax, Amazon.com is facing a boycott from a coalition of California non-profits. One of the groups behind the boycott, Think Before You Click CA, says improved sales tax enforcement will bring in $200 million per year in additional revenue and encourage people to shop at local traditional retailers instead of online.

==== Compromise with Amazon.com ====
In response to resistance from Amazon.com, other online retailers, and anti-tax groups, the State of California agreed to a delay of one year before requiring online retailers to begin collecting sales tax on sales to California addresses. In return for the one-year delay, Amazon.com says it will create 10,000 full-time jobs, 25,000 seasonal jobs, invest $500 million in various facilities in California over the next few years, and begin remitting sales taxes on orders shipped to California. California began collecting sales taxes on September 15, 2012, and the rate will depend upon where the buyer is located. However, this requirement may not apply to third-party sellers on Amazon.

=== Colorado ===
In response to HB 10-1193 passed in 2010, Amazon terminated its relationship with all affiliates located in Colorado. The bill originally sought to tax sales to Colorado residents by online retailers with Colorado affiliates. The bill was amended to remove all reference to affiliates in order to discourage Amazon from cutting ties with them. The final bill required large online retailers to either remit tax on sales to Colorado residents or provide information on Colorado customers to the state. In spite of this move Amazon still decided to terminate its Colorado affiliates.

Amazon began collecting sales tax in Colorado on February 1, 2016. On February 23, 2016, the Federal 10th Circuit Court of Appeals court upheld the law against a legal challenge by the Direct Marketing Association. Ruling Judge Neil M. Gorsuch contended that overturning the law would create a statewide "tax shelter" for online retailers. Following the ruling, policy experts predicted that the decision could lead to a unified push for national internet sales taxes. It is unclear whether or not Amazon collects local taxes.

=== Connecticut ===
In May 2011, Connecticut Gov. Dannel P. Malloy signed legislation that requires online retailers to collect sales tax if they have affiliates in the state. The legislation aims to raise $9.4 million. Amazon said Connecticut's legislation violates Quill Corporation v. North Dakota and immediately moved to terminate its affiliate relationships in Connecticut. Amazon accused traditional retailers such as Wal-Mart of being behind Connecticut's new law.

"We opposed this new tax law because it is unconstitutional and counterproductive. It was supported by big-box retailers, most of which are based outside Connecticut, that seek to harm the affiliate advertising programs of their competitors. Similar legislation in other states has led to job and income losses, and little, if any, new tax revenue," Amazon said in a letter to its affiliates.

Amazon has agreed to collect state sales tax of 6.35% in Connecticut starting November 1, 2013. Amazon has also agreed to invest $50 million in Connecticut and to create hundreds of new full-time jobs in the state.

=== District of Columbia ===
Amazon began collecting DC's 5.75% sales tax on October 1, 2016.

=== Delaware ===
Textbooks rented from Warehouse Deals and shipped to destinations in Delaware are subject to tax.

=== Florida ===
In a 2012 editorial supporting tax equity, the Florida St. Petersburg Times wrote, "As long as Internet-only sellers such as Amazon.com can get away with not collecting state sales tax and effectively sell their products for at least 6 percent less, Florida merchants pay the price. It's past time for lawmakers to work toward a level playing field."

In May 2014, Amazon started collecting sales tax in Florida after starting plans to build two warehouses in the state. Amazon agreed to collect the state sales tax of 6%, but there was no mention of collecting local sales taxes

=== Georgia ===
Georgia had passed a law that became effective in January 2012 expanding the definition of what constituted a physical presence in the state in hopes that it would force online retailers to begin collecting sales taxes. However, Amazon did not collect sales taxes until Amazon agreed to start collecting Georgia sales tax on September 1, 2013.

=== Hawaii ===
In January 2017, Hawaii state lawmakers were considering legislation requiring Amazon and other online retailers to collect sales tax. Amazon began to collect a 4% state sales tax, beginning April 1, 2017.

=== Idaho ===
Amazon began collecting Idaho's 6% sales tax from customers who reside in Idaho beginning Saturday, April 1, 2017.

=== Illinois ===
Illinois passed legislation to tax online sales made to consumers located in the state. In March 2011 Gov. Pat Quinn signed the "Main Street Fairness Act," which targets online retailers with Illinois affiliates. Quinn said the act would help create fair competition and generate more revenue for the state. Illinois estimates that it loses $153 million in sales taxes every year because out-of-state retailers do not remit sales tax on purchases made by Illinois residents. Some online retailers have responded to this legislation and similar efforts in other states by threatening income tax revenues collected from their online affiliates. Amazon, along with Overstock.com, has threatened to terminate affiliates in states that demand that sales tax be collected by online retailers, including Illinois. Wal-Mart responded by inviting online businesses based in Illinois to join its affiliate network.

The Illinois Policy Institute has said that the law has been "all pain and no gain." While it was "sold as a significant revenue raiser and a step toward improved tax fairness, it is accomplishing little more than pushing online entrepreneurs out of state."

The law was declared unconstitutional in October 2013 by the Illinois Supreme Court because it applied only to online businesses. Illinois subsequently passed similar legislation which applied to "catalog, mail-order and similar retailers along with online sellers... if they have sales of $10,000 or more in the prior year." Although the law went into effect January 1, 2015, retailers were given an additional month to comply with the legislation. Online retailers are required to collect the 6.25% state sales tax, but do not have to collect local sales taxes in addition to the state rate.

Amazon announced in October that it plans to build several facilities in Illinois by 2017, including the first this year, which eventually would have required it to collect the state's use tax.

=== Indiana ===
Indianapolis based Simon Property Group sued the state in 2011 to force it to collect sales tax from Amazon in an attempt to level the playing field. In a settlement deal brokered by Gov. Mitch Daniels in January 2012, Amazon agreed to collect sales tax from Indiana residents beginning January 1, 2014. Amazon owns four distribution centers in Indiana, which satisfies the physical requirement.

=== Iowa ===
On January 1, 2017, Amazon began collecting 6% sales tax in Iowa.

=== Kansas ===
Amazon has collected sales tax in Kansas since at least 2005 even though it opened up a distribution center back in 1999, which satisfies the physical presence requirement that often forces retailers to collect sales taxes. Proposed Senate Bill 111 would require online retailers to notify Kansas residents of their sales tax liabilities if the retailer does not collect sales taxes on the transaction.

=== Kentucky ===
Amazon has collected sales tax in Kentucky since 2005 according to the Tax Justice Blog, but Amazon has maintained a distribution center in Kentucky since at least 1999. Kentucky does not have a law requiring sales tax collection for companies that do not have a physical presence in the state.

In a 2011 editorial The State (A South Carolina paper) criticized the Kentucky incentives given to Amazon to build a distribution center in Lexington. They wrote, with respect to the South Carolina deal, that that deal with Amazon created "...yet another exemption in our Swiss-cheese tax code, and surrender[ed] what little leverage we have to collect taxes on the fastest-growing segment of the retail sector — from which we derive the largest share of the revenue that runs state government. It's only a small step from giving Amazon a five-year exemption from collecting the sales taxes from S.C. residents to giving that same break to Walmart, Target and all the other businesses that offer online shopping — as one Senate amendment actually proposed to do."

=== Louisiana ===
As of January 1, 2017, Amazon began collecting sales tax in Louisiana. Louisiana citizens, whose state has one of the highest average combined sales tax rate in the nation, now pay, on average, 9% in state and local sales and use tax for Amazon purchases.

Act 22, passed in on March 14, 2016, requires online retailers to collect sales taxes on online purchases.

=== Maine ===
On April 1, 2017, Amazon started collecting 5.5% sales tax in Maine following pressure from State officials.

=== Maryland ===
On October 1, 2014, Amazon started collecting sales tax in Maryland ahead of a planned opening of a new distribution center in Southeast Baltimore. Maryland does not currently require online retailers without a physical presence in the state to collect sales taxes.

=== Massachusetts ===
On November 1, 2013, Amazon began collecting the states' 6.25% sales tax for Massachusetts residents. The collection only applies to purchases made on Amazon and not to third-party sellers through Amazon. Amazon is now collecting sales taxes primarily because it now has a physical presence in Massachusetts.

=== Michigan ===
On October 1, 2015, Amazon started collecting sales tax in Michigan in accordance with a state law compelling online retailers to do so if they have a physical presence in the state.

=== Minnesota ===
On October 1, 2014, Amazon started collecting sales tax in Minnesota. There is no state law compelling it to collect taxes. This decision came ahead of Amazon's decision to open up a distribution center in Shakopee that is opened in early 2017.

=== Mississippi ===
On January 12, 2017, Mississippi's chief tax collector filed to require any company doing more than $250,000 of sales in Mississippi each year to collect the state's 7% sales tax. Amazon has already begun collecting sales tax as of February 1, 2017. Furthermore, at least 3 bills have been introduced into the state legislature to require remote retailers to pay sales tax. Mississippi will allow the internet tax bill passed by the house committee on February 1, 2017, to die in committee. Lt. Gov. Tate Reeves called the bill unconstitutional.

=== Missouri ===
Two legislators in Missouri have proposed joining the Streamlined Sales Tax Project to ensure that the state collects sales tax on goods shipped from online retailers located out-of-state. Currently Missourians are required to remit use tax for purchases made online but the state government has no practical method to force compliance. Legislative staff report that taxing online sales should significantly increase revenue. Rep. Margo McNeil cited a University of Tennessee study saying that Missouri stands to lose $187 million in 2011 by not taxing online sales. McNeil also said the streamlined sales tax is a good way to end the unfair advantages enjoyed by online retailers over traditional businesses. "The tax is a step in trying to even the playing field because right now we have a lot of people who are going in and using the stores as a showroom and then going home and buying on the Internet", McNeil said.

On February 1, 2017, Amazon began collecting the state portion of the sales tax rate in Missouri that is 4.225 percent, but does not collect city and county portions of the sales tax rate that is charged on local purchases.

=== Nebraska ===
Amazon began collecting sales tax in Nebraska on January 1, 2017. Nebraska does not currently have a law requiring online retailers to collect sales taxes if they do not have a physical presence in the state. The sales tax in Nebraska is 5.5%.

=== Nevada ===
Legislation that would have required Amazon to collect sales tax on purchases shipped to Nevada failed in committee in the state legislature in May 2011. The legislation was proposed by the Retail Association of Nevada and was expected to generate $16 million annually in additional sales tax collections. Concerns about whether such a move might prompt Amazon.com to close its distribution center in the state were partially responsible for derailing this legislation. However, in April 2012, an agreement was reached that would require Amazon to collect sales tax from Nevada customers beginning on January 1, 2014. The agreement would include collecting state and local sales taxes. Nevada does not require other online retailers without a physical presence in Nevada to collect sales taxes.

=== New Jersey ===
Amazon began collecting sales tax in New Jersey on July 1, 2013. This was a result of opening up warehouses in New Jersey. New Jersey has not passed a law that would require online retailers without a physical presence to collect sales taxes.

=== New Mexico ===
Effective April 1, 2017, Amazon began collecting sales taxes in New Mexico. New Mexico's Revenue Department says that just over 5 percent sales tax will be collected with some going to the state's general fund and some going to the cities where the product was purchased. This 5 percent is much less than the average combined state and local sales tax of 7.51%.

Several bills are currently under consideration to reform New Mexico's tax laws and force online retailers to collect sales taxes.

=== New York ===
In 2008, New York passed a law that would force online retailers to collect sales taxes on shipments to state residents. Shortly after the law was signed, Amazon filed a complaint in the New York Supreme Court objecting to the law. The complaint was not based on whether in-state customers should pay tax, but upon the long-standing practice of it being the responsibility of the customer to report the sales tax (known as use tax in this case) and not that of the out-of-state businesses. The lawsuit was tossed out of court in January 2009, when New York State Supreme Court Justice Eileen Bransten stated "there is no basis upon which Amazon can prevail."

As of 2011 Overstock.com is suing New York state to prevent being required to collect sales taxes on goods shipped to New York residents. In order to comply with the physical presence requirement of Quill Corp. v. North Dakota the law targets out-of-state retailers who make use of New York-based affiliates. Overstock.com argues that the use of affiliates is not enough to meet the physical presence test and that the law thus violates the Commerce Clause. In addition to filing suit, Overstock.com has terminated its 3,400 affiliates in New York.

In early 2017, Governor Cuomo proposed that sales tax collection be applied to Amazon's "Marketplace" operations. In April 2017, Amazon began collecting sales tax in the state.

=== North Carolina ===
Due to former state laws, Amazon did not allow North Carolina residents to participate in the Amazon Affiliates program, however this is no longer the case. Starting February 1, 2014, Amazon began collecting NC state sales tax on orders.

=== North Dakota ===
Amazon has collected sales tax in North Dakota since at least 2001 because they operated a fulfillment center in Grand Forks at that time until 2005. Even after closing the fulfillment center, they still collect sales tax even though North Dakota still has not passed any Amazon tax laws.

=== Ohio ===
A study released by the University of Cincinnati in October 2011 determined that Ohio's state government could increase tax revenue by at least $200 million per year if Congress were to require online retailers to collect and remit sales taxes. Ohio consumers who make online purchases are already required to self-report and pay sales tax but compliance is rare. According to the study, even though more than 60 percent of households in the state made at least one purchase from an online retailer in 2010 less than 1 percent of Ohio state income tax returns included tax payments for such purchases.

On June 1, 2015, Amazon began collecting sales tax in the State of Ohio due to the new data centers that are being built at the Columbus, Ohio area. This satisfies the requirement of a physical presence of Amazon to begin collecting sales tax in the state due to the affiliate owned by Amazon.

=== Oklahoma ===
Oklahoma Governor Mary Fallin announced in February 2017 that on March 1, Amazon would begin collecting sales taxes on online purchases. This followed the passage by the state legislature of the Oklahoma Retail Protection Act, introduced by Representative Chad Caldwell. Under the Act, affected retailers are responsible for either collecting and remitting state and local sales tax or notifying their customers of their tax obligations.

=== Pennsylvania ===
The Pennsylvania Department of Revenue released a sales tax bulletin on December 1, 2011, outlining the Commonwealth's interpretation of the Tax Reform Code of 1971 (TRC). The bulletin focuses on the Commonwealth's definition of a nexus for the purposes of collecting sales tax, and points out that the TRC defines a business as "maintaining a place of business in this Commonwealth" if that business engages in an activity within the Commonwealth "either directly or through a subsidiary, representative, or agent, in connection with the lease, sale or delivery of tangible personal property."

While issuing the sales tax bulletin, Revenue Secretary Dan Meuser said that the Commonwealth would lose an estimated $380 million in 2011 due to the non-collection of online sales taxes. At issue is the presence of four Amazon Fulfillment Centers located in Pennsylvania. Early in December 2011, Meuser said that if out-of-state sellers who have not previously collected state sales tax register and start collecting the taxes by February 1, 2012, then the Commonwealth would not seek payments of back taxes. After this deadline, Meuser said the Commonwealth would take enforcement action seeking back taxes. On January 27, 2012, Meuser said that the new tax collection policy was being granted a one time extension until September 1, 2012, because the original "compliance deadline [was] impractical from operational and technical standpoints." Amazon began collecting sales tax in the state beginning on that September 1 deadline. Currently, Amazon just collects Pennsylvania's 6% sales tax, but does not collect any local sales taxes.

=== Rhode Island ===
On February 1, 2017, Amazon began voluntarily collecting Rhode Island's 7% sales tax. Back in 2009, Rhode Island had passed a law which would have forced Amazon to collect sales taxes if it had "affiliates" in the state. As a result, Amazon cut ties with its affiliates in Rhode Island.

=== South Carolina ===
Amazon had agreed to open a distribution center near Columbia, South Carolina that would employ 1,200 people in exchange for a five-year exemption from collection of sales taxes from shoppers in South Carolina. The state House of Representatives rejected the deal in April 2011 and Amazon cancelled plans for its distribution center. Amazon resumed negotiations and offered 2,000 jobs in exchange for a sales tax exemption and other incentives. Under a compromise approved by the South Carolina state legislature in May 2011, Amazon agreed to notify South Carolina customers by email that sales tax was owed on their purchases but shoppers would still be responsible for paying the tax by themselves. Governor Nikki Haley says she plans to allow the bill to become law without signing it.

In a statement made after the deal for Amazon passed the state House the Alliance for Main Street Fairness said, "Today's vote in the South Carolina House of Representatives is just one step in the process, yet it's unfortunate that the majority of the House favors special deals for one prospective retailer at the expense of our state's existing employers and their 375,000 employees. The vote is particularly disappointing in light of dubious, last minute promises that certainly appear to have influenced some legislators to switch their vote. We'll rally our troops and voice our concerns to the Senate where we hope they will come to a more fair and rational decision. The case against this special deal continues to grow on a daily basis."

Main Street expressed strong disapproval of the South Carolina Senate's approval of this arrangement. In a press release Main Street said, "Nobody complained when Amazon was given free land, property tax cuts, job tax credits and a repeal of the limits on weekend sales. But in the end, this special exemption only passed after backroom deals and last-minute promises were made by Amazon officials – something which should disappoint everyone interested in transparency and good government."

South Carolina has passed legislation that required Amazon and other internet retailers to start collecting sales tax in 2016. Prior to 2016, Amazon was not required to collect sales tax on purchases made by South Carolina residents. However, the company was responsible for notifying South Carolina residents via e-mail that they faced liability for sales tax and residents were still required to report the value of all purchases made on Amazon in the previous year and pay the appropriate sales tax on their South Carolina tax return. As of January 1, 2016, the tax legislation has expired, meaning that Amazon is now required to collect sales tax at the point of sale from South Carolina residents.

=== South Dakota ===
On February 1, 2017, Amazon agreed to begin collecting sales tax in South Dakota. This followed legislation passed in 2016 requiring retailers to remit sales tax even if they did not have a physical presence in the state.

=== Tennessee ===
Amazon attempted to avoid being required to collect Tennessee sales tax during negotiations with economic development officials to build two warehouses outside of Chattanooga. Amazon argues that its warehouses are not directly affiliated with the company and thus do not create a nexus that would require the collection of sales taxes. Tennessee revenue officials will not reveal any specific information on a deal with Amazon as they claim doing so would violate state confidentiality laws.

A legal opinion by the state attorney general affirmed the constitutionality of a proposed bill in the state legislature that would require Amazon to collect sales tax on goods it ships to Tennessee residents. The opinion also stated that Amazon's construction of distribution centers in the state constitutes a physical nexus.

According to study done by the University of Tennessee's Center for Business and Economic Research, the Tennessee state government and local governments will lose about $410 million in tax revenue in 2011 due to online sales.

On January 1, 2014, Amazon began collecting sales tax on purchases in Tennessee, after a two-year delay from when Governor Haslam signed the online sales tax bill in 2012. Amazon collects both state and local sales tax.

=== Texas ===
In 2010, Texas sent a demand letter for $269 million in sales taxes that the state argues should have been collected and remitted for sales to Texas customers. This dollar amount covers uncollected taxes from December 2005 to December 2009 and also includes penalties and interest. Texas authorities began an investigation of Amazon's tax status after a May 2008 report by The Dallas Morning News questioned why Amazon does not collect sales tax from Texas customers despite maintaining a distribution center in Irving near the Dallas/Fort Worth International Airport. Amazon argues that this distribution center, owned by Amazon.com KYDC LLC, located at the same address as Amazon's corporate headquarters in Seattle, is a legally separate entity and thus does not establish a physical presence in Texas that would require Amazon to collect sales taxes. Amazon has decided to close the Irving distribution center in order to avoid future attempts by Texas to force the collection of sales taxes.

Texas Comptroller Susan Combs faced skeptical questions and criticism from members of the Texas Senate Finance Committee February 16, 2011, over her attempts to collect back sales tax from Amazon.com. Combs replied by saying that all businesses must obey the law "It is our belief that this is a very, very clear issue about nexus. As I say, this started probably because of catalog sales 47 years ago in 1963," said Combs. Combs also cited a Texas law to back up her argument that Amazon is required to collect sales taxes: "A retailer is engaged in business in this state if the retailer: 1.) maintains, occupies, or uses in this state permanently, temporarily, directly, indirectly or through a subsidiary or agent, however named, an office, place of distribution, sales or sample room or place, warehouse, storage place, or any other place of business." The Dallas Morning News published an editorial supporting Combs' efforts to collect sales tax from Amazon.com on February 17, 2011. The paper wrote, "It defies logic that a book bought online can elude sales tax while the same book bought in a bookstore can't. A sales transaction is a sales transaction, and if one is taxed, why shouldn't the other be taxed as well?"

In March 2010, State Rep. Linda Harper-Brown filed House Bill 2719. House Bill 2719 would allow Amazon to avoid Texas sales tax by amending the state tax code to exempt companies or individuals from being classified as retailers or being ordered to provide state agencies with information on purchases made in Texas, if they make use of "only a fulfillment center...or computer server." House Bill 2719 stands in sharp contrast to House Bill 2403, introduced by Rep. John Otto. House Bill 2403 would close loopholes in the Texas tax code that support Amazon's claim of being exempt from collecting sales tax.

Legislation pushed by Rep. John Otto to require Amazon and other online retailers with a physical nexus in the state of Texas to collect and remit sales tax became law in 2011. The legislation deems any company with a store, distribution center, or other place of business in Texas as having a physical nexus there for the purpose of collecting sales tax. Otto said that Amazon contended that they did not need to collect the state sales tax because the company did not have a store front in the state and that a subsidiary owned their distribution center in Irving, Texas.

In April 2012, Amazon agreed to create 2,500 jobs and invest $200 million in new distribution centers in Texas if the state forgave $269 million in back sales taxes. Under the agreement, Amazon began collecting sales taxes from Texas customers beginning July 1, 2012. Under the agreement, Amazon collects the state sales tax of 6.25%, but likely not local sales tax.

=== Utah ===
Under Utah state law, internet retailers are only required to collect sales tax for online sales if they have a physical presence and Amazon does not have a physical presence in Utah. However, on December 7, 2016, Gov. Gary Herbert announced that his 2017 tax plan includes a deal with Amazon to start collecting sales tax on Utah purchases. Amazon began collecting sales tax on January 1, 2017. The details of the deal between the state and Amazon, however, remain confidential.

=== Vermont ===
As of February 1, 2017, Amazon began collecting Vermont's 6% state sales tax, ahead of a Vermont statute about internet sales tax due to go into effect in July 2017. Online retailers will not be required to collect the 1% local sales tax that many Vermont towns impose.

=== Virginia ===
As of January 2012, Virginia state senator Frank Wagner has introduced legislation that would require companies with a distribution center, warehouse, fulfillment center, office, or other such location in the Commonwealth of Virginia to collect and remit sales tax. Amazon has announced its intent to build two distribution centers in Richmond. This legislation is supported by the Alliance for Main Street Fairness. This legislation was passed in early 2013 with an effective date of September 1, 2013. The only retailers to be affected by this bill, since it only clarifies what qualifies as a physical nexus, are Amazon and backcountry.com.

On January 22, 2012, Gov. Robert F. McDonnell's office announced that an agreement that Amazon.com would begin collecting state sales tax had been reached with Amazon.com and members of the General Assembly. The announcement notes that Amazon.com began collecting and remitting Virginia sales tax on September 1, 2013.

=== West Virginia ===
Starting on October 1, 2013, Amazon began collecting sales tax in West Virginia. This was after West Virginia passed a law requiring out-of-state retailers to apply sales tax if they or a subsidiary have a physical presence in the state.

=== Washington ===
In 2008, Amazon began collecting sales tax in Washington, their home state, after a state law was passed requiring in-state online retailers to collect sales tax. On January 1, 2018, Amazon began enforcing and collecting tax on third-party merchant sales to Washington state customers, as required by a new state law. Washington was the first to have this policy enforced, with plans to bring merchant order taxes to other states in the future.

=== Wisconsin ===
Amazon began collecting sales taxes in Wisconsin on November 1, 2013, about a year before its Kenosha distribution center was set to open. Amazon will only be collecting the 5% state sales tax, but not the local sales tax. Wisconsin has not passed an Amazon law, Amazon is collecting sales tax because of its distribution center in the state.

=== Wyoming ===
Starting March 1, 2017, Amazon voluntarily agreed to begin collecting sales tax in Wyoming. On March 1, 2017, Wyoming passed a bill requiring anyone that does more than 200 transactions or over $100,000 in sales in Wyoming to pay state sales tax.

== Italian legislation ==
On 10 December 2025, Amazon reached an agreement with the Italian Revenue Agency to pay 723 million euros, payable in installments, as part of a case involving allegations of tax fraud for 1.2 billion euros (rising to 3 billion when including penalties and interest) related to alleged illicit conduct between 2019 and 2020.

== Japanese legislation ==
In July 2009, the Tokyo National Tax Agency ruled that Amazon had to pay 14 billion yen ($119 million) in back corporate taxes, despite its operations in the country being formally represented by the U.S.-based subsidiary Amazon Int'l Sales, Inc. Amazon refused to acknowledge the tax debt, claiming Japan had no jurisdiction on Amazon, due to Amazon not having a physical presence or registered company in Japan.

== Swiss legislation ==
Due to a change in the tax law in Switzerland, Amazon has collected Swiss VAT on deliveries sent to the Swiss customs area since 1 January 2019, despite not being based there. Concurrently, Amazon's two North American sites ceased offering delivery to addresses in the Swiss customs union, meaning customers there are obliged to place orders one of Amazon's other websites instead. Previous to this Amazon had not been charging any Swiss VAT on these orders, although parcels entering the Swiss customs area were subject to VAT upon entry if the amount of tax to be collected exceeded 5 Swiss Francs.

== UK legislation ==
It was reported in The Guardian, April 4, 2012, that Amazon generated more than £3.3bn of sales in the UK but paid no corporation tax at all on the profits, and that it was under investigation by the UK tax authorities.

In November 2012, the UK government announced plans to investigate Amazon.com, along with Starbucks and Google, for tax avoidance. Sky News reported that Amazon faced a temporary backlash and boycott from the general public and other businesses in the UK as a result.

Amazon publish annual UK tax contribution statements. However, these have been criticised for not disclosing how much corporation tax is being paid at a country level.

== Affiliates ==
Amazon in the past was often able to overcome threats from state governments by cutting ties with local partners or leaving the state in question. Amazon severed its relationships with affiliates in Colorado due to efforts by the state government to collect sales tax on internet purchases. Amazon has threatened similar action against affiliates in Illinois over the same issue. In February 2011, Amazon announced that it would be closing its Dallas, Texas, distribution center over the sales-tax dispute

== Entity isolation ==
Amazon has created subsidiaries that are treated separately for tax matters, a legal technique called "entity isolation". The subsidiary that developed the Kindle is in California, but because it does not sell the Kindle directly to customers, Amazon's legal position was that it was not required to collect sales taxes in California. In the company's financial report for the quarter ending September 30, 2009, the company stated that the imposition of sales-tax collection by more states or Congress could "decrease our future sales."

== See also ==
- Alliance for Main Street Fairness
- National Bellas Hess v. Illinois
- Quill Corp. v. North Dakota
- South Dakota v. Wayfair, Inc.
- Sales taxes in the United States
