= Sales Tax Management Services =

Type of accounting software

Sales Tax Management Service (STMS) is a type of accounting software that helps companies comply with United States sales tax requirements. STMS systems automatically calculate taxes for individual sales transactions and are delivered on-demand as a web-based “software as a service” (SaaS). They are designed to be compatible with a business's accounting software.

== Operation ==
STMS platforms first validate an address, ensuring that calculated sales tax rates produce invoices with current tax rates for the correct jurisdiction. They also compile transaction data, automatically remit payments and – to varying degrees – can prepare and send sales tax compliance reports required by customers’ taxing jurisdictions.

== Benefits ==
STMS is a newer alternative to established client server-based compliance models, in which companies load and maintain software in their datacenter. Typically, they would receive tax rate and regulation updates monthly via e-mail or on disc. Under such systems, the clients themselves are responsible for downloading these rates or installing the discs. This requires in-house IT support, as well as imposing a continuing cost to keep the information updated.

By contrast, STMS platforms operate in real-time, accessing rate and regulation data from all taxing jurisdictions in the United States (more than 12,500) and automatically calculating taxes as part of a financial transaction. STMS is claimed to automate all the core elements related to sales tax compliance: rate determination, collection, reporting, filing and remittance.

=== Smaller businesses ===
STMS systems were originally designed for smaller businesses, offering an alternative to the software-based systems used by many Fortune 1000 businesses with a broad geographic range of tax reporting requirements and adequate in-house IT support. As in-house software drawing in large tax table databases is costly, smaller firms facing the same statutory compliance requirements were at a disadvantage. STMS is claimed to provide a cost-effective alternative.

== Streamlined Sales Tax Project ==
The Streamlined Sales Tax Project, once known as SSTP but now widely referred to as SST, is a consortium of states that has been developing a centralized standardized system for collecting sales and use tax data across multiple states.

SST has certified certain providers of STMS systems to help implement and manage its centralized collection and remittance system. These certified service vendors will provide sales tax compliance, collection and remittance services to all companies who voluntarily choose to participate in the SST program.

=== Proposed legislation ===
Existing law validated by the Supreme Court of the United States prohibits states from mandating tax collection by companies that do not have a physical presence in the state where a sale is made. The SST group is lobbying the United States Congress to empower states to mandate that all out-of-state businesses, especially internet-based and mail order retailers, collect taxes on their electronic commerce and mail order transactions. The group considers that this measure would enhance the value of the STMS model.
