= Alliance for Main Street Fairness =

Advocacy group in the United States

The Alliance for Main Street Fairness is an advocacy group based in the United States of America dedicated to ending what it sees as unfair tax advantages for online-only retailers with respect to the collection of sales taxes. The group supports the Marketplace Fairness Act (S.1832;112th Congress). Members include retailers such as Wal-Mart, Target, Best Buy, Home Depot, Sears, and thousands of small retailers.

== Issues ==
=== Alibaba ===
The Alliance for Main Street Fairness purchased radio and television ads in December 2014 calling for Congress to end what the group called "special tax treatment" for Alibaba and other e-commerce sites. This was one of the largest public relations campaigns ever conduct against a Chinese company in the United States.

=== Amazon ===
AMSF criticized Amazon's Price Check app and Price Check Day promotion. The AMSF stated, "This app is simply another ploy by Amazon to exploit the loophole that allows them to evade collecting state sales taxes." AMSF also stated, "no retailer can compete with the special treatment" Amazon receives by not being required to collect sales taxes.

=== Borders Books ===
In a statement on the bankruptcy and liquidation of Borders Books AMSF wrote, "Special treatment for Amazon.com is decimating job providers like Borders and countless small businesses across the country. It is simply not fair that one business is able to operate with a government-sanctioned advantage that allows it to undercut its competitors forcing lost jobs and business closures. Lawmakers need to level the playing field and end the special deal that gives Amazon a competitive advantage over Main Street.”

=== Marketplace Fairness Act ===
After eBay implicitly endorsed an exemption for businesses with $30 million or less in annual sales, AMSF attacked the online auctioneer. saying that it was only trying to protect the largest firms selling from its site.

AMSF released a video in late 2014 in support of the Marketplace Fairness Act. The video showcased testimonials from conservative groups and intellectuals supporting "e-fairness." The video includes a brief statement from economist Art Laffer. Laffer released a study touting the benefits of treating online and offline commerce equally. He said that the Marketplace Fairness Act would give states the ability to reduce other taxes.

AMSF criticized Senator Ted Cruz in a BuzzFeed post for his opposition to the Marketplace Fairness Act. AMSF claimed that Cruz had "flip-flopped" on his conservative principles by supporting special tax treatment for online retailers. “While Ted Cruz gallivants across the country giving speeches on the American dream,” the post reads, “he denies it to the local small business owners back home.” In its post AMSF also stated, "Ted Cruz works to tilt the free market in favor of big online retailers LIKE ALIBABA..."

== State legislation ==
=== Pennsylvania ===
In May 2011 the Alliance announced its intention to hand deliver a petition to each state legislator in order to encourage them to support legislation mandating sales taxes for online retailers. In June 2011 the Alliance launched an ad campaign in Pennsylvania featuring television, radio, and newspaper ads across the state.

In December 2011 Pennsylvania changed its rules regarding what constitutes a physical nexus within the state to require more businesses to collect and remit sales tax. Pennsylvania has also added a line on its 2011 income tax form for taxpayers to report online purchases and pay use tax. In February 2012 the Pennsylvania state government predicted that it would collect an additional $40 million in sales tax from internet retailers. Out-of-state online retailers, such as Amazon.com, were granted a one-time reprieve until September 2012 after which they could face enforcement action. The Alliance for Main Street Fairness praised all of these actions.

=== Tennessee ===
In March 2011 the Alliance ran advertisements opposing the efforts of Tennessee officials, including Gov. Bill Haslam, to finalize an agreement with Amazon.com that would exempt the company from collecting sales taxes in exchange for opening two distribution centers in the state. “Why would the state let Amazon get away with not collecting and paying the biggest source of revenue in Tennessee: its sales tax?” one ad said.

In June 2011, state attorney general Roy Cooper affirmed the constitutionality of a proposed bill in the state legislature that building distribution centers in a state creates a physical presence or nexus sufficient to force retailers like Amazon to collect sales tax on goods it ships to Tennessee residents. The Alliance for Main Street Fairness called the attorney general’s opinion “encouraging news for the thousands of Tennessee small business owners who don’t want our elected officials to give Amazon special treatment.”

=== Virginia ===
In January 2012 the Alliance announced its support for legislation introduced by State Senator Frank Wagner that would require companies with a distribution center, warehouse, fulfillment center, office, or other such location in the Commonwealth of Virginia to collect and remit sales tax.

In January 2012 Virginia and Amazon.com reached an agreement regarding the collection of sales tax on purchases made by Virginia residents. Under the agreement Amazon will begin collecting sales tax on purchases made by Virginia residents on 1 September 2013. Amazon will begin collecting sales tax ten months after opening distribution centers in Chesterfield and Dinwiddle counties.

== Membership ==
Alliance for Main Street members include large retailers such as AutoZone, Best Buy, Home Depot, Sears, Target, and Wal-Mart but also has thousands of small-business members. AMSF has a Small Business Advisory Board with representatives from small retailers across the country.

== See also ==
- Streamlined Sales Tax Project
- Quill Corp. v. North Dakota
- National Bellas Hess v. Illinois
- Sales taxes in the United States
- Amazon tax
