= Taxware =

Taxware, LLC
- Company type: Limited Liability Company
- Industry: Transaction Tax Automation
- Predecessor: Audio Visual Products
- Area served: Global
- Key people: Dan Sullivan, CEO of Audio Visual Products and founder of Taxware
- Products: Taxware Enterprise; Sales and Use Tax; Tax Content Solution; TaxSolver
- Services: Sales Tax Service
- Number of employees: 300
- Parent: Vista Equity Partners
- Website: www.taxware.com

Taxware, LLC is a division of Vista Equity Partners that specializes in sales, use and value-added tax calculation. Taxware is based in Wilmington, MA. Founded in 1979, Taxware is Sarbanes-Oxley Section 404 compliant and one of six Certified Service Provider Platforms available to retailers. In December 2012, Taxware was acquired by Vista Equity Partners from Automatic Data Processing.

== History ==
Taxware was founded by Dan Sullivan in 1979 as Audio Visual Products (AVP). In 1980 they released their first product, Sales Tax Rate File. AVP changed its name to Taxware, Int’l in 1996 and in 2000 was purchased by First Data Corporation. In 2003, Taxware acquired TaxSolver from ATX and in 2006, First Data Corps sold Taxware to Automatic Data Processing (ADP).

In December 2012 Taxware was acquired by Vista Equity Partners. As part of the acquisition, Taxware relocated its headquarters from Salem, NH to Ballardvale Office Park in Wilmington, MA.

== Products and services ==
- Taxware Enterprise (TWE) is a global tax calculation engine that operates in nearly every country in the world. TWE operates as part of an existing financial or accounting system.
- Sales and Use Tax System (SUT) is a tax calculation engine that operates specifically in North America. SUT operates as part of an existing financial or accounting system.
- Sales Tax Service (STS) is a filing program where Taxware’s clients delegate tax filings and payments directly to Taxware.
- TaxSolver is a tax-return generation system. TaxSolver processes and converts imported data to generate tax returns. TaxSolver operates as part of an existing financial or accounting system.
- Tax Content Solution (TCS) provides the same tax rates and product taxability rules as featured in the Taxware Enterprise application, without the full calculation engine. TCS is uploaded into a Point of Sale application.
