= Sales and use tax =

Sales and use tax refers to:

- Sales tax
- Use tax
