= AXGIO =

Defunct Chinese electronics brand

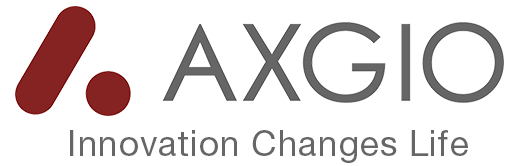
- Product type: Headphones
- Current owner: Shenzhen Digital Era Technology Co., LTD
- Country: China
- Introduced: 2014
- Discontinued: 2018
- Markets: North America, Europe
- Registered as a trademark in: 14 April 2015
- Tagline: Innovation Changes Life
- Website: www.axgio.com

AXGIO was an online brand that belonged to the Chinese Shenzhen Digital Era Technology company. It was used for selling electronics and audio gear such as Bluetooth earphones. The brand was based on the Amazon Marketplace and was launched in 2013.

The brand was used to market earphones and other consumer electronics. Its web site was closed around 2019 and its United States trademark was cancelled in 2021.

== History ==
In 2014, AXGIO opened an official store named AXGIO US on Amazon, marketing mobile phones and accessories. It launched three cellphone models: the Wing W2, Neon N1, and Neon N2Q.

The company's first bluetooth earphones, the Mini Pro, were launched in early 2015. In 2016, the company released the wireless Bluetooth earphones models AXGIO AH-T1 and AXGIO Atom.

The brand was discontinued around 2019 and its trademark registration was left to expire in 2021.

== Products ==
- Chargers – USB wall chargers and car chargers
- Mini Pro- Bluetooth earphones
- Zest - Bluetooth earphones
- Vigour 2 - Bluetooth earphones
- Spirit - Bluetooth earphones
- Sprint - Bluetooth earphones
- VR Headset – Phone peripheral
- Backfit - Bluetooth earphones
- AH-T1 - Bluetooth earphones
- Atom - Bluetooth earphones

== Reception ==
The AXGIO AH-T1 had been generally well-received, both on Amazon and by third party publishers, such as Lifehacker and Forbes.
