= Tax compliance software =

Software used for tax compliance

Tax compliance software is software that assists tax compliance, and may cover income tax, corporate tax, VAT, service tax, customs, sales tax, use tax, or other taxes its users may be required to pay. The software automatically calculates a user's tax liabilities to the government, keeps track of all transactions (in case of indirect taxes), keeps track of eligible tax credits, etc. The software can also generate forms or filings needed for tax compliance. The software will have pre-defined tax rates and slabs and can allocate income or revenue in the right slab itself. The aim of the software is to provide the user with easy way to calculate tax payment and minimize any human error. Tax compliance software has been present in developed countries for long in the form of tax calculators mainly for direct taxes, such as income tax and corporate tax. Gradually some more complex and customized tax compliance software has been designed and developed by organizations around the globe.

Tax compliance software can be divided into two main categories: direct and indirect tax compliance software.

== Direct tax compliance software ==
A direct tax is one paid directly to the government by the persons (juristic or natural) on whom it is imposed (often accompanied by a tax return filed by the taxpayer). Examples include income tax, corporate tax, and transfer tax such as estate tax and gift tax. Basic software for income tax in the form of a tax calculator, and are now widely used. For example, the Government of India provides an income tax calculator on their website. Corporate tax compliance software has also been in existence for years, more often than not within the company's Finance & Accounting software or financial module of ERPs. These suites have the facilities to maintain the company's General Ledger, Cash Management, Accounts Payable, Accounts Receivable, Fixed Assets along with some basic taxes.

== Indirect tax compliance software ==
An indirect tax (such as sales tax, value added tax (VAT), or goods and services tax (GST)) is a tax collected by an intermediary (such as a retail store) from the person who bears the ultimate economic burden of the tax (such as the customer). The intermediary later files a tax return and forwards the tax proceeds to government with the return. Indirect Tax compliance has always been much more complex as compared to the direct taxes. Many indirect tax compliance programs have separate modules for VAT, Service Tax, Customs etc.

=== VAT compliance software ===
Value Added Tax (VAT) legislation has a common structure across countries (and states in case of India). Software must be customized to each country, however, because of differences in the some areas, such as handling of credit of capital goods, sale of scrap and second-hand goods, formats of mandatory submissions and audit exercises.

=== Service tax compliance software ===
Service tax compliance software often include maintenance of credit registers, handling reverse charges, rebate claims on export of services along with payment of tax and filing of returns.

== See also ==
- Streamlined Sales Tax Project
