= CompleteTax =

Online tax preparation software

- Developer: CCH
- Type: Tax software
- License: Proprietary
- Website: CompleteTax.com

CompleteTax was an online tax preparation software developed by CCH, owned by Wolters Kluwer, for individuals to use to prepare and file their federal and state income tax returns in the United States.

CompleteTax's software was designed to guide users to prepare and file federal and state income taxes online, including filling out forms. It had options to file taxes online or to print and send in their tax returns physically. The program had several versions: a Basic option with functions for more streamlined taxes; a Deluxe option for customers with itemized deductions, dependents, investments, and retirement income; and a Premium MVP Option targeted towards self-employed customers and business owners.

In March 2012, CCH launched a mobile version of CompleteTax.

In a review by The Street, it was recommended for more complex tax returns. Complete Tax merged with eSmart Tax as of December 26, 2012.
