= National Conference of State Legislatures =

Nonpartisan group of U.S. state-level legislators

- Abbreviation: NCSL
- Formation: 1975
- Type: Non-governmental organization
- Location(s): Washington, D.C. and Denver
- Chief Executive Officer: Tim Storey
- Website: NCSL.org

The National Conference of State Legislatures (NCSL), established in 1975, is a "nonpartisan public officials' association composed of sitting state legislators" from the states, territories and commonwealths of the United States.

== Background ==
According to their website, the mission of the Conference is:

to advance the effectiveness, independence and integrity of legislatures and to foster interstate cooperation . . . especially in support of state sovereignty and state flexibility and protection from unfunded federal mandates and unwarranted federal preemption. The conference promotes cooperation between state legislatures in the U.S. and those in other countries. . . . [and] is committed to improving the operations and management of state legislatures, and the effectiveness of legislators and legislative staff. NCSL also encourages the practice of high standards of conduct by legislators and legislative staff.

NCSL maintains an office in Denver, Colorado, and Washington, D.C.

Eight Standing Committees, composed of legislators and legislative staff appointed by the leadership of the legislatures, serve as the central organizing mechanism for NCSL members. Each Committee provides a means by which state legislators can share experience, information, and advice on a variety of state issues ranging from policy to management.

Committees meet together twice each year at the NCSL Capitol Forum and NCSL's Legislative Summit to adopt state-federal legislative policies that will ultimately guide NCSL's lobbying efforts in Washington, D.C. These committee meetings also serve as an opportunity for states to network and establish flows of information as well as experience-based suggestions from other states. In addition to the NCSL Capitol Forum and the Legislative Summit, NCSL builds the state legislative community by hosting various web seminars, leadership meetings, and access to relevant websites and online documents throughout the year.

Issues spanning multiple committee jurisdictions are managed by NCSL's Task Forces. Unlike the permanent Standing Committees, Task Forces are created for a specific period time and aim to develop positions on highly complex and controversial issues such as immigration reform and welfare. Task Forces are composed of 20 to 30 legislators and legislative staff who are appointed by the NCSL president or staff chair.

Day-to-day operations of the organization managed by its chief executive officer, Tim Storey. The organization is led by a legislator who serves as its president and by a legislative staffer who serves as staff chair. Twenty years after its founding, NCSL was led in 1994 by its first female president, former Congresswoman Karen McCarthy. Its first African-American president, Rep. Dan Blue, served in 1998–99. The 2021–22 president of NCSL is Representative Scott Saiki of Hawaii, and the staff chair is J.J. Gentry of South Carolina. Each year, NCSL's presidency alternates between legislators of the Republican and Democratic parties.

The NCSL is considered part of the 'Big Seven', a group of organizations that represent local and state government in the United States.

== Presidents and staff chairs ==
Presidents and staff chairs
| President | | | | | Term | Staff chair | | |
| Name | State | State office | Political party | Region | Term | Name | State | State staff position |
|---|---|---|---|---|---|---|---|---|
| Kevin B. Harrington | Massachusetts | Senate President | Democratic | East | 1975 | Eugene Farnum | Michigan | Senate Fiscal Agency Director |
| Tom Jensen | Tennessee | House Minority Leader | Republican | South | 1975–76 | Bonnie Reese | Wisconsin | Legislative Council Executive Director |
| Martin Olav Sabo | Minnesota | House Speaker | Democratic | Midwest | 1976–77 | McDowell Lee | Alabama | Senate Secretary |
| Fred Anderson | Colorado | Senate President | Republican | West | 1977–78 | Robert Herman | New York | Special Assistant to the Speaker of the State Assembly |
| Jason Boe | Oregon | Senate President | Democratic | West | 1978–79 | Art Palmer | Nevada | Nevada Legislative Counsel Bureau Director |
| George B. Roberts Jr. | New Hampshire | House Speaker | Republican | East | 1979–80 | David Johnston | Ohio | Legislative Services Committee Director |
| Richard Hodes | Florida | House Speaker Pro Tempore | Democratic | South | 1980–81 | Patrick Flahaven | Minnesota | Senate Secretary |
| Ross Doyen | Kansas | Senate President | Republican | Midwest | 1981–82 | Robert Smartt | New Jersey | General Assembly Deputy Director |
| William F. Passannante | New York | Assembly Speaker Pro Tempore | Democratic | East | 1982–83 | Joe Brown | Florida | Senate Secretary |
| Miles Ferry | Utah | Senate President | Republican | West | 1983–84 | John Lattimer | Illinois | Committee on International Cooperation Director |
| John Bragg | Tennessee | House Deputy Speaker | Democratic | South | 1984–85 | Leo Memmott | Utah | Legislative Fiscal Analyst |
| David Nething | North Dakota | Senate Majority Leader | Republican | Midwest | 1985–86 | Dale Cattanach | Wisconsin | State Auditor |
| Irving J. Stolberg | Connecticut | House Speaker | Democratic | East | 1986–87 | Sue Bauman | Kansas | Executive Assistant to the Senate President |
| Ted L. Strickland | Colorado | Senate President | Republican | West | 1987–88 | John Andreason | Idaho | Legislative Budget Office Director |
| Samuel B. Nunez Jr. | Louisiana | Senate President Pro Tempore | Democratic | South | 1988–89 | Betty King | Texas | Secretary of the Senate |
| Lee A. Daniels | Illinois | House Minority Leader | Republican | Midwest | 1989–90 | Patrick O'Donnell | Nebraska | Clerk of the Legislature |
| John L. Martin | Maine | House Speaker | Democratic | East | 1990–91 | William Russell | Vermont | Chief Counsel |
| Bud Burke | Kansas | Senate President | Republican | Midwest | 1991–92 | Terry Anderson | South Dakota | Legislative Research Council Director |
| Art Hamilton | Arizona | House minority leader | Democratic | West | 1992–93 | Donald Schneider | Wisconsin | Senate Chief Clerk |
| Robert Connor | Delaware | Senate Minority Whip | Republican | East | 1993–94 | John Turcotte | Mississippi | Joint Legislative PEER Committee member |
| Karen McCarthy | Missouri | House member | Democratic | South | 1994 | Ted Ferris | Arizona | Joint Budget Committee member |
| Jane L. Campbell | Ohio | House member | Democratic | Midwest | 1995 | Ted Ferris | Arizona | Joint Budget Committee member |
| James J. Lack | New York | Senate | Republican | East | 1995–96 | Alfred "Butch" Speer | Louisiana | House Clerk |
| Michael Box | Alabama | Alabama | Democratic | South | 1996–97 | Russell T. Larson | Delaware | Controller General |
| Richard Finan | Ohio | Senate President | Republican | Midwest | 1997–98 | Anne Walker | Missouri | House Chief Clerk |
| Dan Blue | North Carolina | House Majoiry Leader | Democratic | South | 1998–99 | Tom Tedcastle | Florida | Bill Drafting and General Counsel Director |
| Paul Mannweiler | Indiana | House Republican Leader | Republican | Midwest | 1999–2000 | John B. Phelps | Florida | House Clerk |
| Jim Costa | California | Senate member | Democrat | West | 2000–01 | Diane Bolender | Iowa | Legislative Service Bureau Director |
| Stephen M. Saland | New York | Senate member | Republican | East | 2001–02 | Ramona Kenady | Oregon | House Chief Clerk |
| Angela Monson | Oklahoma | Senate member | Democratic | South | 2002–03 | Gary Olson | Michigan | Senate Fiscal Agency Director |
| Martin Stephens | Utah | House Speaker | Republican | West | 2003–04 | Max Arinder | Mississippi | Joint Legislative PEER Committee Executive Director |
| John Hurson | Maryland | House Delegate | Democratic | South | 2004–05 | Jim Greenwalt | Minnesota | Senate Information Systems Director |
| Steve Rauschenberger | Illinois | Senate Assistant Republican Leader | Republican | Midwest | 2005–06 | Susan Clarke Schaar | Virginia | Senate Clerk |
| Leticia Van de Putte | Texas | Senate member | Democratic | South | 2006–07 | Steve Miller | Wisconsin | Legislative Reference Bureau Chief |
| Donna Stone | Delaware | House member | Republican | East | 2007–08 | Sharon Crouch-Steidel | Virginia | Director of Information Systems Virginia |
| Joe Hackney | North Carolina | Speaker | Democratic | South | 2008–09 | Gary VanLandingham | Florida | Office of Program Policy Analysis and Government Accountability Director |
| Don Balfour | Georgia | Senate | Republican | South | 2009–10 | Nancy Cyr | Nebraska | Legislative Research Division Legal Counsel |
| Richard T. Moore | Massachusetts | Senate member | Democratic | East | 2010–11 | Tim Rice | Illinois | Legislative Information System Executive Director |
| Stephen Morris | Kansas | Senate member | Republican | Midwest | 2011–12 | Michael Adams | Virginia | Senate Director of Strategic Planning |
| Terie Norelli | New Hampshire | House member | Democratic | East | 2012–13 | Patsy Spaw | Texas | Secretary of the Senate |
| Bruce Starr | Oregon | Senate member | Republican | West | 2013–14 | Tom Wright | Alaska | Chief of Staff to the House Speaker |
| Debbie Smith | Nevada | Senate member | Democratic | West | 2014–15 | Margaret “Peggy” Piety | Indiana | Indiana Legislative Services Agency Senior Staff Attorney |
| Curt Bramble | Utah | Senate member | Republican | West | 2015–16 | Karl Aro | Maryland | Department of Legislative Services Director |
| Mike Gronstal | Iowa | Senate Majority Leader | Democratic | Midwest | 2016 | Raúl Burciaga | New Mexico | Legislative Council Service Director |
| Dan Blue | North Carolina | Senate Democratic Leader | Democratic | East | 2017 | Raúl Burciaga | New Mexico | Legislative Council Service Director |
| Deb Peters | South Dakota | Senate member | Republican | Midwest | 2017–18 | Chuck Truesdell | Kentucky | Legislative Research Commission |
| Toi Hutchinson | Illinois | Senate member | Democratic | Midwest | 2018–19 | Jon Heining | Texas | Legislative Council General Counsel |
| Robin Vos | Wisconsin | Assembly Speaker | Republican | Midwest | 2019–21 | Martha Wigton | Georgia | House Budget and Research Office Director |
| Scott Saiki | Hawaii | House Speaker | Democratic | West | 2021–20 | J.J. Gentry | South Carolina | Senate Counsel |
| Scott Bedke | Idaho | House Speaker | Republican | West | 2022–23 | Anne Sappenfield | Wisconsin | Legislative Council Director |
| Robin Vos | Wisconsin | Assembly Speaker | Republican | Midwest | 2022–23 | Anne Sappenfield | Wisconsin | Legislative Council Director |
| Brian Patrick Kennedy | Rhode Island | House Speaker Pro Tempore | Democratic | East | 2023–24 | Sabrina Lewellen | Arkansas | Deputy Director and Assistant Secretary of the Senate |
| Wayne Harper | Utah | Senate President Pro Tempore | Republican | West | 2024–25 | John Snyder | Kentucky | Legislative Research Commission Transportation Committee Staff Administrator |

== Committees ==
NCSL has eight standing committees whose membership consists of state legislators and staff:

- Budgets and Revenue
- Communications, Financial Services, and Interstate Commerce
- Education
- Health and Human Services
- Labor and Economic Development
- Law, Criminal Justice and Public Safety
- Natural Resources and Infrastructure
- Redistricting and Elections

These committees establish policy positions and coordinate lobbying efforts in Washington, D.C.

== Task forces ==
NCSL uses task forces to complement the work of the eight standing committees. Composed of legislators and legislative staff, task forces are temporary and deal with issues that cut across the jurisdictions of multiple standing committees. Currently, there are eight task forces:

- Agriculture
- Cybersecurity
- Energy Supply
- Immigration and the States
- Innovations in State Health Systems
- Insurance
- International Relations
- Military and Veterans Affairs
- State and Local Taxation

== Policy positions ==
In the most general terms, NCSL works to enhance the role of states in the federal system. NCSL opposes unfunded federal mandates and federal preemption of state authority, providing state legislatures with the flexibility to implement policy solutions. NCSL supports enactment of the Main Street Fairness Act, which would simplify existing sales tax collection laws. The Act would grant states the authority to require all sellers, including online merchants, to collect sales and use taxes, generating billions of dollars of tax revenue for state governments.

NCSL also supports the SAFE Banking Act, which would facilitate access to banking and financial services for the legalized cannabis industry.

== Inaccurate Voter ID Study ==
In 2025 the NCSL website published at summary of state voter ID rules (updated April 2024). In a diagram of the United States, NCSL incorrectly states for Minnesota: "No document required to vote". The section "Table 1: Voter Identification Laws In Force in 2025" does not list Minnesota.

The Minnesota Secretary of State's website outlines voter ID registration requirements, including photo ID and other alternatives that establish identity and residence. The Secretary of State's office is responsible for elections, including documentation and training of election judges who register voters and control access to ballots on election day.

The false NCSL claim was referenced by the Minnesota Star Tribune in coverage of the 2026 primary election: "Thirty-six states requires some form of ID for in-person voting, according to the National Conference of State Legislatures, some stricter than others. Minnesota is not among them."

== Professional staff associations ==
The organization runs nine professional staff associations.

=== American Society of Legislative Clerks and Secretaries ===
The American Society of Legislative Clerks and Secretaries (ASLCS) was founded in 1943 to improve legislative administration, and to establish better communication between clerks and secretaries throughout the United States and its territories. In 1974, ASLCS joined with several state legislative groups to form the National Conference of State Legislatures (NCSL). The society includes an active membership of more than four hundred principal clerks, secretaries, and legislative support staff.

==== Publications and standards ====
ASLCS publishes several reference and resource books, including the Legislative Administrator, the Professional Journal, the Roster and Reference Guide, the International Directory, Mason's Manual

The Legislative Administrator is the official newsletter of the American Society of Legislative Clerks and Secretaries.

Professional Journal

"The Journal" provides a forum to share experiences, expertise and opinions on a variety of subjects influencing our daily working environment.

International Directory

The International Directory is a booklet that provides a resource in English, Spanish and French of the objectives and goals of the American Society of Legislative Clerks and Secretaries (ASLCS), Association of Chief Clerks of Mexico's State Legislatures and the Federal Dict of Mexico (ANOMAC), Association of Central American Legislative Clerks (ATELCA), the Canadian Clerks-at-the Table, South African Legislative Secretaries Association (SALSA), and the Australian Clerks. The booklet also contains the names, phone numbers, fax numbers and e-mail addresses of the executive committee members of the respective organizations.

Inside the Legislative Process

Inside the Legislative Process is a research tool, providing information on state legislative processes and procedures. The ASLCS committee on Inside the Legislative Process is responsible for reviewing and producing this publication. The committee works closely with NCSL staff to develop survey questions and record the responses in a format that is easily usable by all legislative units and reflects current legislative processes.

==== International relations ====
Additionally, the Joint Canadian-American Clerks' Conference is held biennially in odd-numbered years. It is hosted alternately between Canada and the United States. Unlike other Society meetings, participation in this conference is limited to principal clerks and secretaries or to the principal assistant if the clerk or secretary is unable to attend. The meeting typically occurs in August or September. The location is determined by joint recommendation of the ASLCS Canadian/American Relations Committee and the Canadian Association of Clerks-at-the-Table.

== Events ==
NCSL organizes two annual events for the general membership:

- NCSL Capitol Forum
- Legislative Summit (Annual Meeting)

The Legislative Summit is the largest of these events, partly because it occurs in the summer when state legislatures are in recess. Its location varies year to year. The NCSL Capitol Forum alternates between Washington D.C., and a location that varies year to year.

== See also ==
- Bipartisanship
- Council of State Governments
- State Government Affairs Council
- State Innovation Exchange, a progressive organization that produces model legislation
- State Policy Network, a consortium of conservative and libertarian state think tanks
- Uniform Law Commission
