= Main Street Fairness Act =

The Main Street Fairness Act (H.R. 5660) was a bill introduced in the United States House of Representatives to "promote simplification and fairness in the administration and collection of sales and use taxes, and for other purposes." Specifically, the Main Street Fairness Act would have allowed state governments to require out-of-state retailers to collect and remit sales tax on purchases shipped to residents of those states. The Main Street Fairness Act was introduced by William Delahunt, a Democrat from Massachusetts, on June 30, 2010 and the bill expired at the end of the 111th Congress without being enacted.

== Current law ==
Under current state laws, consumers are generally responsible for paying the sales tax due on their online purchases. Due to problems with compliance, some states have considered laws which would compel online retailers to report consumers' purchases to state tax collectors. Some consumer advocacy groups believe such reporting requirements violates consumer privacy. By shifting the remittance duty of sales tax from consumers to retailers, the Main Street Fairness Act would make it unnecessary for retailers to report customers' purchases to the state.

=== National Bellas Hess ===
In National Bellas Hess, Inc. v. Department of Revenue of Illinois, 386 US 753 (1967), it was held that a business whose only contacts with the taxing state are by mail or by common carrier lacks the "substantial nexus" required under the Dormant Commerce Clause.

=== Quill case ===
In Quill Corp. v. North Dakota (1992) the Supreme Court ruled that a business must have a physical presence in a state for that state to require it to collect sales taxes.

The decision in Quill has been a point of contention for states as e-Commerce had grown greatly during the 21st century. Spurred by Justice Anthony Kennedy's concurrence in Direct Marketing Ass'n v. Brohl, which spoke to a review of Quill, several states passed "kill Quill" laws to bring such a review to the Supreme Court.

==== South Dakota v. Wayfair, Inc. ====
In the first such challenge review, South Dakota v. Wayfair, Inc., heard in the 2018 term, the Court found that the physical presence rule defined by Quill was "unsound and incorrect", and overturned both Quill and the remaining portions of National Bellas Hess.

== Arguments ==
Supporters of the Main Street Fairness Act say it will benefit state and local governments by increasing tax revenue and protect local businesses from unfair competition that exploits what they see as a tax loophole.

== See also ==
- Alliance for Main Street Fairness
- Sales taxes in the United States
- Amazon tax
- Foreign Accounts Tax Compliance Act
