= American Legislative Exchange Council =

American conservative lobbying group

- Abbreviation: ALEC
- Formation: September 1973; 53 years ago
- Type: Nonprofit organization
- Legal status: 501(c)(3)
- Headquarters: 2733 Crystal Drive, Suite 1000, Crystal City, Arlington County, Virginia, U.S.
- Coordinates: 38.8470°N 77.0523°W
- National Chair: Patricia Rucker
- Chief Executive Officer: Lisa Nelson
- Revenue: $10.9 million (2024)
- Expenses: $10.6 million (2024)
- Staff: 40 (2023)
- Website: ALEC.org
- Formerly called: Conservative Caucus of State Legislators

The American Legislative Exchange Council (ALEC) is a nonprofit organization of conservative state legislators and private sector representatives who draft and share model legislation for distribution among state governments in the United States.

ALEC provides a forum for state legislators and private sector members to collaborate on model bills—draft legislation that members may customize and introduce for debate in their own state legislatures. ALEC has produced model bills on a broad range of issues, such as reducing regulation and individual and corporate taxation, combating illegal immigration, loosening environmental regulations, tightening voter identification rules, weakening labor unions, and opposing gun control. Some of these bills dominate legislative agendas in states that include Arizona, Wisconsin, Colorado, Michigan, New Hampshire, and Maine. Approximately 200 model bills become law each year. ALEC also serves as a networking tool among certain state legislators, allowing them to research conservative policies implemented in other states. Many ALEC legislators say the organization converts campaign rhetoric and nascent policy ideas into legislative language.

ALEC's activities, while legal, received public scrutiny after news reports in 2012 from outlets such as The New York Times and Bloomberg Businessweek described ALEC as an organization that gave corporate interests outsized influence. Resulting public pressure led to a number of legislators and corporations withdrawing from the organization. However, at ALEC's July 2022 policy summit, Insider reported on a political commentator who stated that if the conservative constitutional convention movement—which "is gaining momentum" largely out of public view—is successful in its plan to rewrite the Constitution, the USA will become the "conservative nation" ALEC has been working toward.

== History ==
=== 1973 to 2010 ===
ALEC was founded in 1973 in Chicago as the Conservative Caucus of State Legislators, a project initiated by Mark Rhoads, an Illinois state house staffer, to counter the Environmental Protection Agency, wage, and price controls, and to respond to the defeat of Barry Goldwater in the 1964 presidential election.

Conservative legislators felt the word "conservative" was unpopular with the public at the time, however, so the organization was renamed to the American Legislative Exchange Council. In 1975, with the support of the American Conservative Union, ALEC registered as a federal nonprofit agency. Bill Moyers and Greenpeace have attributed the establishment of ALEC to the influential Powell Memorandum, which led to the rise of a new business activist movement in the 1970s.

ALEC was co-founded by conservative activist Paul Weyrich, who also co-founded The Heritage Foundation. Henry Hyde, who later became a U.S. congressman, and Lou Barnett, who later became national political director of Ronald Reagan's Political Action Committee, also helped to found ALEC. Early members included a number of state and local politicians who went on to statewide office, such as Bob Kasten, Tommy Thompson, and Scott Walker of Wisconsin, John Engler of Michigan, Terry Branstad of Iowa, Mitch Daniels of Indiana, and John Boehner and John Kasich of Ohio. Several members of Congress also were involved in the organization during its early years, including Rep. Jack Kemp of New York, Sen. Jesse Helms of North Carolina, Sen. James L. Buckley of New York, Rep. Phil Crane of Illinois, and Rep Eric Cantor of Virginia.

In the 1980s, ALEC opposed U.S. disinvestment from South Africa, a movement to put pressure on the South African government to embark on negotiations with a goal of dismantling apartheid. In 1985, ALEC also published a memo that opposed "the current homosexual movement", portrayed homosexuality as a result of a conscious choice, and said that pedophilia was "one of the more dominant practices within the homosexual world". ALEC spokesman Bill Meierling discussed the document in 2013 and said that ALEC does not draft model bills on social issues, and added, "I'm also sad that the critics would not acknowledge that organizations change over time."

Duane Parde served as the executive director from December 1996 to January 2006. Lori Roman, who served in the same role from 2006 to 2008, had an imperious style that led to financial difficulties and the departure of two thirds of ALEC's staff. According to Dolores Mertz, then a Democratic Iowa state representative and chairwoman of the ALEC board, ALEC became increasingly partisan during that period, with Roman once telling Mertz "she didn't like Democrats and she wasn't going to work with them." Ron Scheberle became executive director in 2010 after acting as a lobbyist for Verizon Communications (previously GTE) and as an ALEC board member.

By 2011, the number of ALEC legislative members had reached 2,000, including more than 25 percent of all state legislators nationwide. Approximately 1,000 bills based on ALEC language were being introduced in state legislatures every year, with approximately 20% of those bills being enacted.

=== Since 2011 ===
Prior to 2011, ALEC's practices and its ties to specific pieces of legislation were little known outside of political circles. In July 2011, The Nation published a series of articles produced in collaboration with the Center for Media and Democracy (CMD) that showcased some of the ALEC model bills and described ties to the Koch family, and CMD launched a website "ALEC Exposed" that documented more than 800 of ALEC model bills, the legislators and corporations that had helped to draft them, and the states that enacted them.

The joint effort, and particularly its coverage of ALEC's push for tough voter ID laws, prompted the advocacy group Color of Change to launch a public campaign to pressure corporations to withdraw their ALEC memberships.

The criticism among media outlets and political opponents was that ALEC was secretly subverting democratic institutions to further the aims of its corporate benefactors. Oregon state representative and ALEC member Gene Whisnant said in December 2011, "We're getting a lot of attention saying we're trying to destroy the earth and everything on it." ALEC staff and members promoted the organization as promoting public-private partnerships for the advancement of free market principles. ALEC senior director of membership and development Chaz Cirame said, "The hook about some conspiracy or some secret organization is a lot better story than one about bringing state legislators together to talk about best practices around the country."

In 2012, ALEC was the subject of an Occupy movement protest, an Internal Revenue Service complaint by Common Cause, and calls for attorney general investigations in several states.

The killing of Trayvon Martin on February 26, 2012, led to increased public attention on "Stand-your-ground" gun laws that ALEC had supported. Color of Change launched a new campaign in April to pressure ALEC corporate members to withdraw. More than sixty corporations and foundations, including Coca-Cola, Wendy's, Kraft Foods, McDonald's, Amazon.com, General Electric, Apple, Procter & Gamble, Walmart, the Gates Foundation, and the medical insurance group Blue Cross and Blue Shield dropped support of ALEC in the ensuing weeks or let their memberships lapse. Thirty-four legislative members also left ALEC.

ALEC responded by releasing a statement describing efforts by its critics as a "campaign launched by a coalition of extreme liberal activists committed to silencing anyone who disagrees with their agenda". Doug Clopp of Common Cause credited ALEC Exposed for the successful campaign, saying that "for 40 years you couldn't get the kind of accountability we're seeing now because ALEC, its members, its legislators, its bills were secret."

Former Visa Inc. lobbyist, Newt Gingrich aide, and GOPAC executive director, Lisa B. Nelson, succeeded Scheberle as CEO of ALEC in 2014.

In late 2014, a number of technology-oriented companies such as Google, Microsoft, Facebook, eBay, and Yahoo! announced that they were ending their ties to ALEC. Multiple companies cited environmental concerns as a point of contention with the organization. Google Executive Chairman Eric Schmidt remarked that ALEC was "just literally lying" about recent global climate change. Yahoo!, Uber, and Lyft also announced withdrawals later that same week. Occidental Petroleum and Northrop Grumman also cut ties with ALEC. In response to the departure of Northrop Grumman, an ALEC spokesperson said, "Like any other membership group, membership in ALEC ebbs and flows, and in 2014 we gained far more private-sector members than we lost." T-Mobile and BP severed ties with ALEC in 2015.

In 2023, ALEC held its fiftieth anniversary celebrations in Washington, D.C. The celebrations included a gala event at the National Portrait Gallery.

ALEC is a member of the advisory board of Project 2025, a collection of conservative and right-wing policy proposals from The Heritage Foundation to reshape the United States federal government and consolidate executive power should the Republican nominee win the 2024 presidential election.

== Organization ==
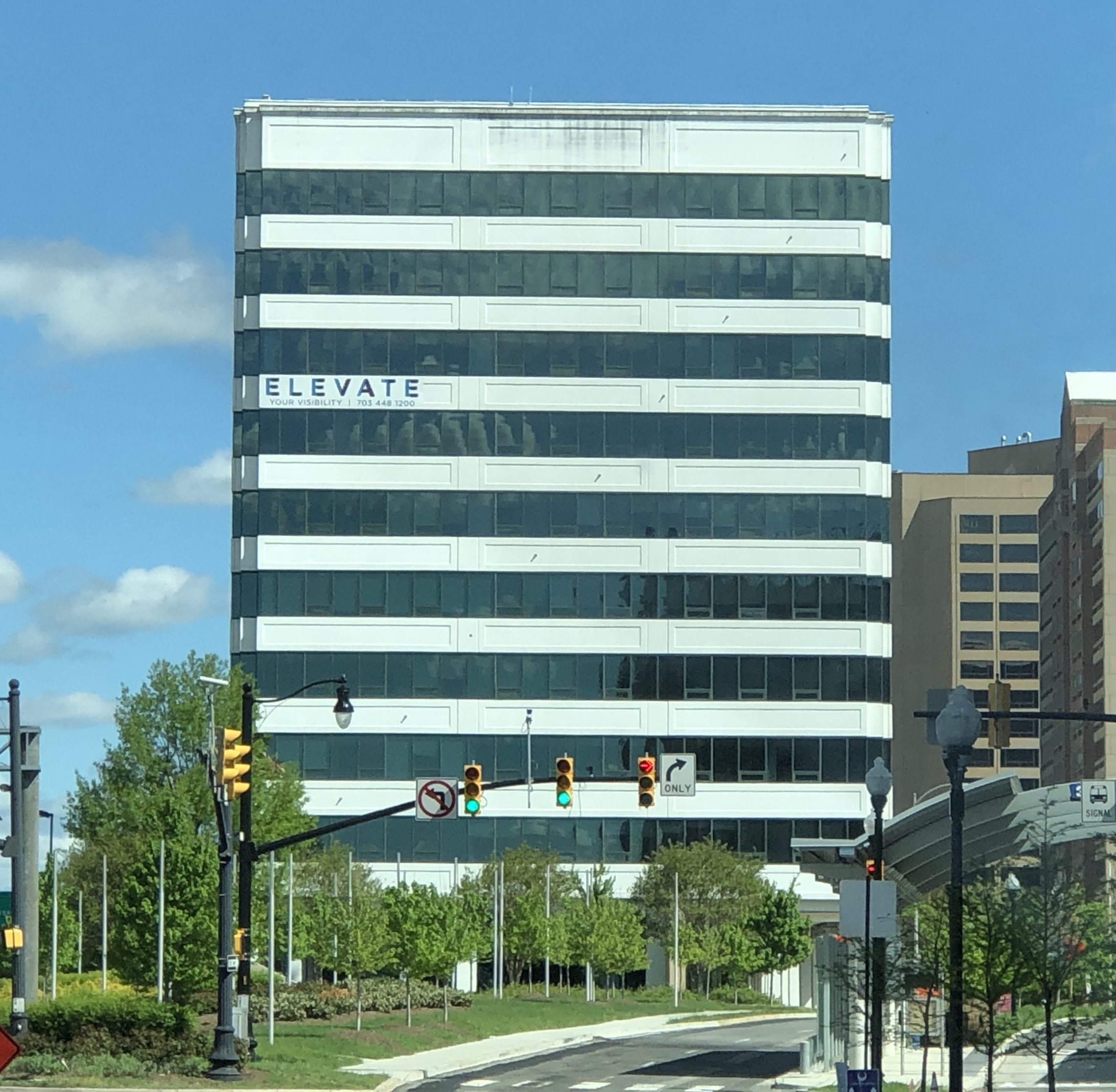
ALEC's headquarters in the Crystal City section of Arlington County, Virginia

As of December 2013, ALEC had more than 85 members of Congress and 14 sitting or former governors who were considered "alumni". The majority of the ALEC legislative members belong to the Republican Party. Membership statistics presented at an ALEC board meeting in 2013 indicated that the 1,810 members represented 24% of all state legislative seats across the U.S., and that ALEC members represented 100% of the legislative seats in Iowa and South Dakota. It also has approximately 300 corporate, foundation, and other private-sector members. The chairmanship of ALEC is a rotating position, with a new legislator appointed to the position each year. As of 2012, 28 out of 33 of its chairs had been Republicans.

ALEC has nine task forces that generate model bills that members may customize and introduce for debate in their own state legislatures. Private sector members effectively have veto power over model bills drafted by the task forces.

The ALEC Public Safety and Elections Task Force, which promoted stand your ground gun laws and voter identification requirements, was disbanded in April 2012. Thereafter, the National Center for Public Policy Research announced the creation of a voter ID task force to replace the one discontinued by ALEC.

Bills drafted by the task forces must be approved by the ALEC board of directors, composed exclusively of legislators, before they are designated as model bills. ALEC also has a Private Enterprise Advisory Council, which meets whenever the board of directors meets. Council members include representatives from prominent corporations such as ExxonMobil, Pfizer, AT&T, SAP, State Farm Insurance and Koch Industries. ALEC statements assert that the council provides advice to the board of directors. Former ALEC co-chairman Noble Ellington said in 2011, "I really kind of think of us as one board," although he added, "It's certainly not our goal to sit there and do everything that business wants to have done."

Day-to-day operations are run from ALEC's Arlington County, Virginia, office by an executive director and a staff of approximately 30. ALEC's bylaws specify that "... full membership shall be open to persons dedicated to the preservation of individual liberty, basic American values and institutions, productive free enterprise, and limited representative government, who support the purposes of ALEC, and who serve, or formerly serve, as members of a state or territorial legislature, the United States Congress, or similar bodies outside the United States."

ALEC also has a Board of Scholars that advises staff and members. The board is composed of Arthur Laffer, an economist who served on Ronald Reagan's Economic Policy Advisory Board; Victor Schwartz, chair of Public Policy at Shook, Hardy & Bacon; Richard Vedder, economics professor emeritus at Ohio University and adjunct scholar at the American Enterprise Institute; and Rob Natelson, a constitutional scholar.

ALEC also has ties to the State Policy Network (SPN), a national association of conservative and libertarian think-tanks. SPN is a member of ALEC, and ALEC is an associate member of the SPN. SPN encourages its members to join ALEC, and many members of SPN are also members of ALEC. Some of the think tanks in the SPN write model legislation, which then is introduced at ALEC private meetings. ALEC is "SPN's sister organisation" according to The Guardian. ALEC is also a member of the Atlas Network, a global organization of free-market think tanks.

As of 2012, ALEC is registered as a charity in 37 states.

== Notable policies and model bills ==
The ALEC website states that its goal is to advance "the fundamental principles of free-market enterprise, limited government, and federalism". In 2003, Donald Ray Kennard, then a Louisiana state representative and ALEC national chairman, said, "We are a very, very conservative organization... We're just espousing what we really believe in." Craig Horn, a North Carolina state representative and ALEC member, said of ALEC in 2013, "It's a lightning rod organization because it has a decidedly conservative bent—there’s no doubt about it."

Although ALEC originally focused on social issues such as abortion, which it opposed, in more recent years the group has focused more on business and regulatory matters. According to John Nichols of The Nation, ALEC's agenda "seems to be dictated at almost every turn by multinational corporations. It's to clear the way for lower taxes, less regulation, a lot of protection against lawsuits, [and] ALEC is very, very active in [the] opening up of areas via privatization for corporations to make more money, particularly in places you might not usually expect like public education."

A Brookings Institution study of state legislation introduced in 2011–2012 found that ALEC model bills that became law were linked most often to controversial social and economic issues. The study concluded that this phenomenon has hurt ALEC because, "Dirtying its hands with social issues undermines ALEC's ability to exercise influence over fiscal ones."

According to research by Columbia University political scientist Alex Hertel-Fernandez, ALEC model legislation during the late 1970s focused primarily on social issues, such as abortion, drugs, gun laws, religious freedom and anti-busing. By the 1980s, the focus was primarily on criminal justice. By the 1990s, the focus was overwhelmingly on business deregulation.

=== 'Stand Your Ground' laws ===
Stand-your-ground laws expanded to 30 states through the support of ALEC, after Florida passed its law in 2005. After the Florida law had been passed, ALEC adopted a model bill with the same wording. In the wake of the killing of Trayvon Martin in 2012, ALEC's support for Stand Your Ground laws ultimately led to the departure of high-profile corporate members such as Coca-Cola, Microsoft, Bank of America, and General Motors.

=== Voter ID laws ===
After Obama's victory in the 2008 presidential election, ALEC's internal publication (which it provides to paying members) asserted, without evidence, that voter fraud contributed to his victory. ALEC said that groups like ACORN had engaged in voter-registration fraud whereby fake voter registrations were submitted.

Prior to 2012, legislation based on ALEC model bills was introduced in many states to mandate or strengthen requirements that voters produce state-issued photographic identification. The bills were passed and signed into law in six states. Voter identification bills introduced in 34 states would have made voting more difficult for students, the elderly, and the poor. According to research by Columbia University political scientist Alex Hertel-Fernandez, "Of the 62 ID laws states considered during the 2011 and 2012 legislative sessions, more than half were proposed by lawmakers who... were all participants in the American Legislative Exchange Council, or ALEC. In exchange for their payments of $50 per year in membership dues, those legislators had access to a draft proposal for strict voter ID requirements".

=== Immigration ===
The "Support Our Law Enforcement and Safe Neighborhoods Act", an Arizona law commonly known as "SB 1070", was drafted during an ALEC meeting in December 2009 and became an ALEC model bill. Enacted in 2010, SB 1070 was described as the toughest illegal immigration law in the U.S. Portions of SB 1070 were held by the Supreme Court to be preempted by federal law in 2012.

Bills similar to SB 1070 were passed in Alabama, Georgia, Indiana, and Utah, and have been introduced in 17 other states.

A 2018 study characterized ALEC as highly influential in the spread of policies intended to curb sanctuary cities (jurisdictions where immigration enforcement is not a law enforcement priority).

=== Labor policy ===
The organization publishes a Labor Reform Policy document which it says champions "worker freedom". The document advocates for right-to-work laws, endorses the Supreme Court's Janus v. AFSCME decision that allowed public sector workers to choose whether or not to pay union dues, and contains state-by-state fact sheets on the prevailing minimum wage, union landscape, and public and private sector union membership rates.

In 2011, longtime ALEC member and Wisconsin Governor Scott Walker helped pass Wisconsin Act 10, which implemented an ALEC policy of restricting the collective bargaining rights of state and local government employees.

ALEC's model bills include a Resolution to Align Pay and Benefits of Public Sector Workers with Private Sector Workers, which would mandate that "retirement benefit obligations to all state and municipal workers shall be immediately adjusted to a level comparable to that of private-sector workers." Another ALEC model bill is a Paycheck Protection Act, which would require that unions establish separate segregated funds for political activities, and prohibit the collection of union dues for those activities without the express authorization of the employee. ALEC has also drafted a model law called the Living Wage Mandate Preemption Act. It prohibits a local municipality, city, county or township from enacting a living wage that is greater than the state's minimum wage.

=== Animal and Ecological Terrorism Act ===
One of ALEC's model bills is the "Animal and Ecological Terrorism Act", which classifies certain property destruction, acts of intimidation, and civil disobedience by environmental and animal rights activists as terrorism. This model bill appeared across the U.S. in various forms since it was drafted in 2003. The federal "Animal Enterprise Terrorism Act" has notable similarities, and at points almost verbatim language, to ALEC's model "Animal and Ecological Terrorism Act". The Senate version of the "Animal Enterprise Terrorism Act" was sponsored by Senator James Inhofe, a long-time member of ALEC.

Many ag-gag bills are also similar to ALEC's model "Animal and Ecological Terrorism Act", which would make it against the law to film, videotape, or take photographs on livestock farms in order to "defame the facility or its owner". People found to be in violation would be put in a "terrorist registry".

=== Criminal sentencing and prison management ===
According to Governing magazine, "ALEC has been a major force behind both privatizing state prison space and keeping prisons filled." ALEC has developed model bills advancing "tough on crime" initiatives, including "truth in sentencing" and "three strikes" laws. Critics argue that by funding and participating in ALEC's Criminal Justice Task Force, private prison companies directly influence legislation for tougher, longer sentences. Corrections Corporation of America and Wackenhut Corrections, two of the largest for-profit prison companies in the U.S. (as of 2004), have been contributors to ALEC. ALEC also has worked to pass state laws to allow the creation of private-sector for-profit prisons.

Marie Gottschalk, professor of political science at the University of Pennsylvania, said that ALEC has played a major role in "liberating the private sector to employ penal labor and expand the privatization of corrections." Economist Paul Krugman wrote in 2012 that ALEC had "a special interest in privatization—that is, on turning the provision of public services, from schools to prisons, over to for-profit corporations," and as such played a significant role in the "penal–industrial complex". As an example, Krugman wrote that the American Bail Coalition had declared publicly that ALEC was its "life preserver."

By 2013, ALEC disbanded the task force that favored harsh sentencing and supported reducing prison overcrowding and lowering the costs associated with the criminal justice system. At that time, ALEC promoted investing taxpayer money in alternatives to incarceration, such as electronic monitoring.

=== Energy and the environment ===
ALEC pushed for deregulation of the electricity industry in the 1990s. Maneuvering between two private sector members, the former energy trader, Enron, and the utilities trade association, Edison Electric Institute (EEI), resulted in EEI withdrawing its ALEC membership. Enron's position on the matter was adopted by ALEC and subsequently, by many state legislatures.

In 2011, ALEC adopted model legislation having to do with public "right to know" laws regarding what fluids are used in hydraulic fracturing (also known as "fracking") that was promoted as a victory for the right of consumers to know about potential drinking water contaminants, in spite of the fact that the bill contained "loopholes that would allow energy companies to withhold the names of certain fluid contents, for reasons including that they have been deemed trade secrets".

ALEC has promoted a model bill that called plans in 2011 by the federal Environmental Protection Agency to regulate greenhouse gas emissions, a "train wreck" that would harm the economy, and it has supported efforts by various states to withdraw from regional climate change compacts. In 2013, their resolution stated "Alec is very concerned about the potential economic impact of greenhouse gas regulation on electricity prices and the harm EPA regulations may have on the economic recovery". ALEC also has promoted a model bill that would call on the federal government to approve the proposed Keystone XL project, which would extend a synthetic crude oil pipeline from oil sands in Alberta, Canada to Nebraska.

In 2013, ALEC planned legislation that would weaken state clean energy regulations and penalize homeowners who install their own solar panels and redistribute the electricity back into the grid, whom ALEC has described as "freeriders" because they do not pay for the infrastructure costs of recirculating their generated power.

Also in 2013, ALEC adopted a model bill saying that the role of human activity in causing climate change was uncertain, that man-made climate change could be "deleterious, neutral or possibly beneficial," and that the cost of regulating greenhouse gas emissions could cause "great economic dislocation." ALEC also has invited climate change deniers, such as Craig Idso, to speak at its national meetings. In 2015 Common Cause and the League of Conservation Voters pointed to such behavior to accuse ALEC of denying climate change. ALEC responded by threatening legal action, denying that ALEC supports climate change denial, and saying it has more recently welcomed debate on the subject and supported renewable energy and carbon tax policies to curb global warming.

Several corporations have announced that their affiliations with ALEC will be allowed to lapse over disagreement with the group's opposition to action on climate change. These include Ford, BP, Microsoft, Google and Shell. A statement by Shell said "its stance on climate change is clearly inconsistent with our own...We have long recognized both the importance of the climate challenge and the critical role energy has in determining quality of life for people across the world." An ALEC spokesperson responded "Climate change activists have conflated our opposition to the government picking winners and losers as climate change denial."

In December 2016, Tesla Motors (not an ALEC member) hosted an ALEC event in Washington, D.C., where ALEC promoted its "Energy Innovation Project", that was partly funded by the ClearPath Foundation. The project guides states toward innovation and entrepreneurship surrounding U.S. energy resources.

ALEC has promoted draft bills for restrictions on single-use plastic drinking straws. The draft bill contains exemptions for fast food and fast casual restaurants, and preempts municipalities from imposing stricter regulations.

=== Telecommunications and information technology ===
AT&T and Verizon drafted ALEC model legislation prohibiting public broadband services and "sunsetting" the Public Switched Telephone Network (PSTN). Names of its 172-member task force, the agenda of a December 2010 meeting, and its minutes that included a resolution regarding traffic pumping were published by Common Cause. In February 2014, Senate Bill 304 in Kansas was introduced, "prohibiting cities and counties from building public broadband networks and providing internet service to businesses and citizens". The bill contains an "underserved area" exemption for public wi-fi, but the exemption criterion is not met anywhere in Kansas. The city of Chanute, Kansas, which has led broadband development since the 1980s, financed through its public electricity company, including free wi-fi in its college, hospital, and public spaces, and a 4g mobile data network, felt under attack by the bill. The bill failed.

=== Health care ===
In 1989, ALEC published the draft "HIV Assault Act", which made it a crime for someone who is knowingly infected with HIV (the virus that causes AIDS) to have sex with a person who is not infected, without disclosing the HIV infection. The bill made having such sex without disclosure a criminal offense, even when HIV was not transmitted. Alan Smith, who worked on the draft, said the proposed law was a response to worries that people with AIDS were deliberately infecting others, "to make sure more people got it so more research money could be devoted to curing it".

ALEC opposes the individual health insurance mandate enacted by the Patient Protection and Affordable Care Act (commonly known as the "ACA" or "Obamacare"). ALEC filed an amicus brief in National Federation of Independent Business v. Sebelius, urging the Supreme Court to strike down the individual mandate of the ACA. In 2011, ALEC published the "State Legislators Guide to Repealing ObamaCare", which has served as a road map for repeal efforts. ALEC also has drafted a variety of model bills designed to block implementation of the law.

In August 2013, ALEC approved the "Health Care Freedom Act" as a model bill that aims to strip health insurers of their licenses to do business at the federal health care exchanges of ACA if they accepted any subsidies under the system. Sean Riley, the head of the ALEC Health and Human Services task force, said the aim of the proposed legislation was to protect businesses from the ACA's employer mandate. Slate journalist David Weigel has called the bill a "sneak attack" on the ACA. Health insurance experts have predicted that if the bill were widely adopted by Republican-controlled states, it would seriously disrupt the exchange and threaten the ACA. Wendell Potter, former health insurance executive and CMD fellow, said, "You cannot build the healthcare system based on the free market unless you have subsidies. If they are taken away the whole thing collapses."

=== LGBT rights ===
In the 1980s, ALEC pushed anti-gay propaganda, and urged legislators to oppose attempts to "homosexualize society." ALEC said that homosexual relations were "probably some of the most destructive and degrading institutions in America today". ALEC claimed homosexuality caused psychological harm, led to pedophilia, and that homosexuals sought to recruit the young.

An investigation by the Southern Poverty Law Center and The Center for Media and Democracy found that ALEC is part of a coalition of groups called Back to Neutral who oppose "'woke' corporations that act to diversify their leadership or take a public stance on social and democracy issues." According to the SPLC, the Back to the Neutral coalition includes "right-wing think tanks, advocacy groups, media organizations and two anti-LGBTQ hate groups."

=== Smoking ===
In 1986, while ALEC was funded by the tobacco industry, it disputed the science linking tobacco smoke to health harms.

In July 2012, The Guardian reported that ALEC had taken action to oppose plain cigarette packaging laws outside the United States, including the UK and Australia. Karla Jones, a task force director for ALEC, said that the brands were the corporations' most valuable assets. ALEC stated that generic cigarette packaging increased cigarette consumption, rather than reduced it. ALEC's advocacy against "plain packaging" of tobacco products was cited as partial motivation for an academic study on the effectiveness of plain packaging, which found that "plain packaging can reduce positive perceptions of smoking and dissuade tobacco use."

=== Israel and Palestine ===
Following the October 7 attacks in 2023, ALEC began promoting model legislation to affirm "support for Israel's right to pursue without interference or condemnation the elimination of Hamas". By November 20, a version of its bill had been passed in Pennsylvania, Nebraska, North Dakota, and at least five other US states. The legislation included the validation of Israeli claims that Hamas receives logistical support from Iran and that it uses "civilians as human shields". Previously, ALEC had been a leader in over 30 US states in opposition to boycotts, divestment, and sanctions against Israel. In 2024, Israeli scholar and activist Neve Gordon said the bills "shield Israel from Palestinian-led efforts to mobilize against the crime of apartheid."

=== Other issues ===
ALEC has worked to privatize public education, frequently promoting model bills that expand public-private partnerships in education.

It has provided model legislation that led to the enactment of aggressive personal and corporate income tax cuts in Kansas in 2012. Governor Sam Brownback, who promoted and signed the legislation, was advised by the supply-side economist and ALEC board member, Arthur Laffer, who said at the time that the cuts would pay for themselves and lead to increased growth. By fall 2014, however, the tax cuts had led to the depletion of a $700 million budget surplus, and although Kansas had experienced 6.6% job growth from 2010 to 2013, that figure lagged behind the nation's overall 8.8% job growth for the same period.

It also has promoted a model bill that limits liability for parent companies that acquire subsidiaries responsible for asbestos-related injuries.

== Training and assistance ==
In addition to providing a forum for the drafting of model legislation that may be adapted easily, ALEC also provides assistance and training to its legislative members. The Oregon co-chairman of ALEC, Gene Whisnant, described the organization in 2012 as a "great resource" for part-time legislators with limited staff resources. Mark Pocan, a Democratic congressman from Wisconsin and former member of the Wisconsin Assembly, said in 2012 that ALEC advises members, "'Don't just introduce a single piece of legislation, introduce 14.' That way people can't oppose any one bill." At one ALEC meeting, media experts gave messaging advice and taught legislators how to use Twitter to move ALEC bills through their chambers. Attendants also offered to write op-ed articles in local newspapers for the legislators and to put lawmakers in touch with other subject matter experts.

== Transparency ==
Although Governing Magazine reported in 2003 that ALEC meetings traditionally had been open to the public, news organizations have reported since then that many meetings are held in private. ALEC policy seminars are open to reporters and other nonmembers, but public conference agendas, unlike those distributed to members, do not include the names of presenters, the lists of legislative and private-sector board chairs, nor the corporate sponsors of the seminars. Task force meetings and bill-drafting sessions are held behind closed doors. Bloggers from ThinkProgress and AlterNet were removed from conferences for attempting to take photographs of such sessions and tweeting the names of ALEC members who participated. In 2013, The Washington Post columnist Dana Milbank was turned away from the ALEC annual policy summit and told by spokesperson Bill Meierling that subcommittee meetings and task force meetings were closed-door. Meierling said ALEC was introducing transparency gradually, but it "can't just kick the doors open". Shortly after the Milbank incident, the Brookings Institution reported that ALEC's activities during its closed-door meetings are "still a mystery", and that "ALEC could have a tremendous influence over lawmaking in the American states, or it could have none at all—we just don't know." In 2014, Nebraska legislator and former ALEC member Jeremy Nordquist described ALEC as a "faceless organization", saying, "It's allowing these corporate interests to just duck and cover, and hide from really stepping into the public square and putting their ideas forward."

ALEC does not disclose its membership list nor the origins of its model bills. Lawmakers generally propose ALEC-drafted bills in their states without disclosing the ALEC authorship. For instance, in 2012 The Star-Ledger analyzed more than 100 bills and regulations previously proposed by the administration of New Jersey governor Chris Christie and found a pattern of similarities with ALEC model bills that was "too strong to be accidental". The connections were based "not on similarity of broad ideas, but on specific numbers, time frames, benchmarks and language". Legislative staffers in the Christie administration had "mined ALEC for advice on budgetary matters, Medicaid changes and privatizing government services...beginning in the earliest days of Christie's governorship". William Schluter, vice chairman of the New Jersey Ethics Commission and a former Republican state senator, said there was a "clear connection between ALEC and the proposed New Jersey legislation". A Christie spokesperson denied any connection between the two.

One exception to this pattern came in November 2011, when former Florida State Representative Rachel Burgin introduced legislation to call on the federal government to reduce its corporate tax rate. She mistakenly included the boilerplate "WHEREAS, it is the mission of the American Legislative Exchange Council to advance Jeffersonian principles of free markets, limited government, federalism, and individual liberty..." When the inclusion of the ALEC mission statement was discovered, the bill was withdrawn and resubmitted without the phrase. The American Prospect journalist Abby Rapoport wrote that the incident "seems to confirm what many have assumed was occurring in state legislatures—and while Burgin's bill was hardly a major piece of legislation, ALEC's reach in important policy areas seems hard to overestimate."

Critics sometimes argue that by adopting ALEC model bills without disclosure, state officials are handing off the duty of doing their own work to a business-centered lobby. In early 2012, Democratic lawmakers in Arizona and Wisconsin introduced the "ALEC Accountability Act of 2012", which would have required corporations to disclose ALEC funding. Arizona House of Representatives Assistant Minority Leader Steve Farley, sponsor of the Arizona bill, argued that corporations have the right to present arguments, but not secretly.

Prior to 2013, access to ALEC model bills was restricted, and its website required a password to access them. On July 13, 2011, the Center for Media and Democracy, in cooperation with The Nation, posted 850 model bills created during a 30-year period, and created a web project, ALEC Exposed, to host these model bills. The leak has been credited with triggering critical coverage about ALEC in both left-wing and mainstream media outlets. ALEC subsequently published its model bills on its website, although the Brookings Institution wrote in 2013 that there was "reason to believe" its list was incomplete.

On October 1, 2012, Common Cause, a liberal political advocacy group, along with the Center for Media and Democracy (CMD), filed a lawsuit under a Wisconsin open records law alleging five Republican lawmakers did not disclose whether they had used personal e-mail accounts for correspondence with ALEC. In one instance, a Wisconsin legislative representative had requested of ALEC in June 2012 that all correspondence be sent to his personal account. According to CMD, the legislators settled the suit in late October 2012, allowing their personal e-mails to be searched for such contacts and paying $2,500 in court costs as part of the settlement.

In 2013, ALEC's North Carolina state chairman Jason Saine described the organization as "a resource for experts you can tap that follow a philosophy that you do from a less government viewpoint", and said, "It's not just some big secretive organization that it's been portrayed."

== Corporate influence and allegations of lobbying activity ==
=== Corporate influence ===
The level of influence that the ALEC private-sector members hold over its public-sector members has been controversial. According to The New York Times, special interests have effectively turned ALEC's lawmaker members into "stealth lobbyists" for conservative causes. The Guardian has described ALEC as "a dating agency for Republican state legislators and big corporations," to set rightwing legislative agendas. The Free Lance-Star has reported that ALEC had become "one of Big Business's most effective lobbying tools". Bloomberg Businessweek described the organization as a "bill laundry" that "offers companies substantial benefits that seem to have little to do with ideology." Chris Taylor, a Democratic Wisconsin state assemblyman who attended an ALEC conference in 2013, said, "In my observation, it was the corporations and the right-wing think tanks driving the agendas. Corporations have as big a say as the legislators in the model legislation that is adopted."

ALEC legislative members generally deny being overly influenced by the organization or its model legislation, and argue that corporate input in the drafting process helps to promote business growth. "ALEC is unique in the sense that it puts legislators and companies together and they create policy collectively," said Scott Pruitt, then an Oklahoma state representative and ALEC task force chair. Vance Wilkins, a former Republican speaker of the Virginia House of Delegates and ALEC member, said in 2002, "Just because business writes a bill doesn't make it bad. We get bills from all angles. And we still have to debate the issue." Whisnant, ALEC's Oregon co-chair, acknowledged in 2012 that corporations sometimes write model bills to promote their own interests and added, "But that doesn't mean I'll support them." Harvey Morgan, another former Virginia delegate and ALEC member, said of ALEC conferences, "You know before you go that the big-business view will prevail, and that's not necessarily bad. I still would like them to be a little more objective."

Alan Rosenthal, a former Rutgers University political science professor and expert on state legislatures and lobbying, said in 2012, "Legislators don't sit down with a quill pen and draft legislation. I think legislators should have the right to turn to wherever they want to get the ideas they prefer... I have some confidence that they're not being flimflammed."

Experts agree that, regardless of its propriety, the ALEC model has been very effective. Bloomberg Politics reported in 2014 that ALEC had "no equal" in accessing conservative policymakers. Rosenthal said of ALEC, "You've had the interest groups having access and sitting on other task forces, but here you've really perfected it... You've not only got them gaining access and interacting with legislators but you have them shaping policy together. It seems to me that's a pretty major advance." Edwin Bender, executive director of the nonpartisan OpenSecrets has said, "What makes ALEC different is its effectiveness in not just bringing the people together but selling a piece of legislation that was written by the industry and for the industry and selling it as a piece of mainstream legislation."

=== Allegations of lobbying activity ===
In April 2012, Common Cause filed a complaint with the Internal Revenue Service objecting to ALEC's tax status as a nonprofit organization and alleged that lobbying accounted for more than 60% of its expenditures. ALEC formally denied lobbying, although Delores Mertz, who had previously served as chairwoman of the ALEC board, said she was "concerned about the lobbying that's going on, especially with [ALEC's] 501(c)3 status". Reporting on the allegations, Bloomberg Businessweek compared ALEC's work to that of lobbyists, noting, "part of ALEC's mission is to present industry-backed legislation as grass-roots work," and that being a nonprofit rather than a lobby group allows deductibility of membership dues and freedom from disclosing the names of legislators who attend its educational seminars or the executives who give presentations to those legislators. William Schluter, vice chairman of the New Jersey Ethics Commission and a former Republican state senator, said of ALEC's activities, "When you get right down to it, this is not different from lobbying. It is lobbying. ...Any kind of large organization that adds to public policy or has initiatives involving public policy should be disclosed—not only their name, but who is backing them." According to Governing magazine, ALEC legislators often have their travel expenses paid as "scholarships" and are "wined and dined and golf-coursed" by private sector members. In July 2013, Common Cause submitted a supplemental brief to the IRS complaining about these practices.

ALEC responded to the original Common Cause complaint by denying it engaged in lobbying, while saying that liberal groups were attacking ALEC because "they don't have a comparable group that is as effective as ALEC in enacting policies into law." As of 2015, the IRS investigation remained open.

Statutes in Colorado, South Carolina, and Indiana exempt ALEC, specifically by name, from having to register as a lobbyist and report lobbying expenditures. In 2013, ALEC created a 501(c)(4) organization called the "Jeffersonian Project" that, according to The Guardian, "would allow Alec to be far more overt in its lobbying activities than its current charitable status as a 501(c)(3)".

== Funding ==
As of 2011, corporation, think tank, and trade group members accounted for almost 99% of ALEC's $7 million budget. Legislators pay $100 in biennial membership dues, or $50 per year, while non-legislators pay $7,000 to $25,000 to join, and more to participate in the task forces. In 2010, NPR reported that tax records showed that corporations had collectively paid as much as $6 million a year to ALEC. ALEC's total revenue in 2011 was $9 million.

In 2010, ALEC received $100,000 each from AT&T, Allergan, and RJ Reynolds Tobacco Company to be named as "president level" sponsors at its annual meeting. Eleven other members, including Pfizer (PFE) and the Institute for Legal Reform, paid $50,000 each to be named as "chairman level" sponsors. As of 2011, Altria, the Blue Cross Blue Shield Association, and BP America were also $50,000 chairman level sponsors.

ExxonMobil's foundation donated $30,000 to ALEC in both 2005 and 2006. Alan Jeffers, an ExxonMobil spokesman, said the company paid $39,000 in dues in 2010 and sponsored a reception at the annual meeting in San Diego for $25,000. In August 2011, Exxon spent $45,000 to sponsor a workshop on natural gas. According to the Center For Public Integrity, ALEC received $150,000 from Charles and David Koch in 2011. Greenpeace claims that ALEC has received $525,858 from Koch foundations between 2005 and 2011.

Corporate members also pay $3,000 to $10,000 for seats on task forces.

According to a December 2013 article in The Guardian, ALEC faced a funding shortfall after "losing more than a third of its projected income" when some 400 state legislators left its membership, along with more than 60 corporate donors. The organization's 2013 tax return indicated a 13% drop in total revenue from $8.4 million to $7.3 million. On its 2016 tax return, ALEC reported an increase in total revenue from $9.0 million the prior year to $10.3 million.

== See also ==
- Council of State Governments
- National Conference of State Legislatures (NCSL)
- Project Blitz
- Regulatory capture
- State Government Affairs Council
- State Innovation Exchange (SiX) (formerly the American Legislative and Issue Campaign), an organization that produces model legislation from a progressive standpoint
