= Senator Ferry =

Senator Ferry may refer to:

== Members of the United States Senate ==
- Orris S. Ferry (1823–1875), U.S. Senator from Connecticut
- Thomas W. Ferry (1827–1896), U.S. Senator from Michigan

== United States state senate members ==
- Miles Ferry (1932–2017), Utah State Senate
- W. Mont Ferry (1871–1938), Utah State Senate
- William H. Ferry (1819–1880), New York State Senate
