= State Government Affairs Council =

United States organization

The State Government Affairs Council (SGAC) was created in 1975 by government affairs executives of major corporations to provide support to several major United States non-governmental organizations, including the National Conference of State Legislatures, the Council of State Governments, and the American Legislative Exchange Council (ALEC).

The State Government Affairs Council is the premier national association for multi-state government affairs professionals, providing opportunities for networking and professional development. SGAC as an organization does not take positions on matters of public policy, but through its members seeks to enhance policy-makers' knowledge of various business perspectives. SGAC often meets during major NCSL and CSG meetings, as well as it holds its own separate conferences. It is led by a president elected among its members to a one-year term and an executive director, who serves at the pleasure of its executive committee.

Mission statement: SGAC's mission is to advance and support the state government affairs profession by fostering community and relationship building with peers and elected officials, building knowledge, and promoting diverse perspectives in a nonpartisan environment.
