= Amazon Marketplace =

E-commerce platform for third-party sellers

- Website type: E-commerce platform
- Available in: Multiple languages
- Headquarters: Seattle, Washington, U.S.
- Owner: Amazon, Inc.
- Founder: Jeff Bezos
- Industry: E-commerce
- Parent: Amazon
- Website: Amazon Seller Central
- Commercial: Yes
- Registration: Required for sellers
- Launched: November 6, 2000; 25 years ago
- Current status: Active

Amazon Marketplace is the e-commerce platform of Amazon that enables third-party sellers to sell new or used products directly to consumers on a fixed-price online marketplace alongside Amazon's regular offerings. Using Amazon Marketplace, third-party sellers gain access to Amazon's customer base, and Amazon expands the offerings on its site without having to invest in additional inventory.

This is in contrast to first-party sellers (1P sellers) who act as wholesale suppliers that sell goods directly to Amazon. Amazon calls these sellers "vendors" and they operate using Amazon's Vendor Central.

== Overview ==
Items purchased on Amazon from third-party sellers are either fulfilled by the merchant (FBM) or fulfilled by Amazon (FBA). FBM goods are kept in the third-party seller's inventory, and shipping and customer service are handled by the third-party merchant. FBA goods are stored in Amazon's fulfillment centers, and shipping and customer service are handled by Amazon.

Amazon charges its third-party merchants a referral fee for each sale which is a percentage of the sales price. Additionally fulfillment by Amazon (FBA) fees, referral fees, subscription fee and storage fees. and also the advertising on Amazon which is optional.

As of 2020, third-party sales on Amazon accounted for 54% of paid units. In 2016, more than 10,000 third-party sellers generated more than $1 billion of annual sales. Over 1,000,000 third-party sellers joined in 2017. The growing success of these Amazon sellers has garnered the attention of some of the largest e-commerce roll-up businesses – known as Amazon Aggregators. These aggregators operate a buy-and-build model, deploying capital to acquire attractive brands and leverage in-house operational expertise to increase growth and maximize margin. A variety of strategies are used to achieve this, including listing optimization, spending on marketing & advertising, inventory & supply chain management, and expansion geographically or into other direct-to-consumer channels. As of October 2021, there are 79 aggregators with $10.9bn in disclosed funding.

There are three major paths third-party sellers can take on Amazon: wholesale, private label, and retail arbitrage.

If an Amazon Seller has an active registered trademark for their brand that appears on their products or packaging and can verify themselves as the rights owner or the authorized agent for the trademark, they can apply for Amazon Brand Registry.

Amazon has an internal search algorithm (A9) that works almost in the same way as those of Google or Bing. The algorithm analyzes search queries that users enter in a search bar and selects the most relevant offers from brands with a good track record.

== Locations ==
Amazon Marketplaces worldwide

As of March 2021, Amazon Marketplace operates worldwide in 20 countries; chronologically:

- United States
- Canada
- Mexico
- United Kingdom
- Germany
- France
- Italy
- Spain
- Japan
- Singapore
- Turkey
- Brazil
- Australia
- India
- United Arab Emirates
- Saudi Arabia
- Netherlands
- Sweden
- Poland
- South Africa

Additionally, Amazon maintains limited operations in China.

== Criticism ==
Amazon's dispute resolution policies and practices for Marketplace have drawn criticism from many sellers. The Verge has reported that many fear a complaint lodged against them with Amazon more than they would an actual lawsuit. Among their specific complaints are that policies are vague and contradictory, that buyers are often taken at their word and thus businesses are forced to admit and correct wrongdoing for perceived or minimal shortcomings rather than contest the complaint since there is no other way to get reinstated. Rules meant to protect sellers have also been weaponized, with many merchants devoting their energies to getting competitors suspended or removed from the site entirely.

On July 3, 2019, the US Third Circuit Court of Appeals ruled against Amazon.com Inc., stating that the online retailer can be held liable under state law for third-party sales on its portal. After granting Amazon's petition for rehearing en banc, in a decision issued on June 2, 2020, the 3rd Circuit subsequently vacated the prior order and certified to the Pennsylvania Supreme Court the question of whether, under Pennsylvania law, an e-commerce business like Amazon is strictly liable for a defective product that was purchased on its platform from a third-party vendor, which product was neither possessed nor owned by the e-commerce business. The Pennsylvania Supreme Court accepted the question for consideration; however, the case settled via stipulated dismissal between the parties and was discontinued by the court before such hearing could occur.

The company has faced numerous complaints since its inception related to its customer support. As of January 2024 the company has a BBB rating of B.

== See also ==
- Amazon tax — Information about paying sales tax as a seller or as a buyer
- Criticism of Amazon — Includes information on the misuse of Marketplace facilities
