= Miles Ferry =

American politician (1932–2017)

Miles "Cap" Ferry

Member of the Utah Senate from the 20th, 24th district
- In office 1967–1984

President of the National Conference of State Legislatures
- In office 1983–1984
- Preceded by: William F. Passannante
- Succeeded by: John Bragg

Member of the Utah House of Representatives
- In office 1964–1967

Personal details
- Born: September 22, 1932 Brigham City, Utah, United States
- Died: March 31, 2017 (aged 84) Corinne, Utah
- Party: Republican
- Spouse: Suzanne Call Ferry
- Profession: Farmer, Rancher, Politician

Miles "Cap" Ferry (September 22, 1932 – March 31, 2017) is an American former politician who was a Republican member of the Utah House of Representatives and Utah State Senate. He attended Utah State University, earning a Bachelor of Science degree. Ferry was a farmer and rancher, managing the J.Y. Ferry & Son ranch. He won an Outstanding Young Farmer award in 1958 and was the FFA Honorary State Farmer in 1975. In the state senate, he was Minority Whip from 1975 to 1976, Minority Leader from 1977 to 1978, and President of the Senate from 1979 to 1984. Ferry resigned his senate seat in 1984 to accept an appointment to the position of the State Commissioner of Agriculture, a position he held from 1985 to 1993.
