= State Innovation Exchange =

Political Non Profit

Coordinates: 43.0763°N 89.4053°W

- Abbreviation: SiX
- Formation: 2012; 14 years ago
- Type: Tax exempt, nonprofit organization, 501(c)(3)
- Headquarters: Madison, Wisconsin, United States
- Co-Executive Directors: Neha Patel, Jessie Ulibarri
- Website: stateinnovation.org

The State Innovation Exchange (SIX), formerly American Legislative and Issue Campaign Exchange (ALICE), is a nonprofit organization established in September 2012 by the Center on Wisconsin Strategy (COWS) at the University of Wisconsin–Madison. The organization provides an online database of state-level legislation that has been passed in a state for politicians and activists to replicate and enact in state legislatures. SIX focuses on providing liberal and progressive model legislation.

The nonprofit, nonpartisan organization is supported by government grants and foundations, but does not receive university funding, it is however a recipient of The Democracy Alliance. COWS receives formal support from the university in the form of tax status.

In 2014, ALICE merged with the Progressive States Network (founded in 2005 by Joel Barkin as another progressive answer to ALEC) and the Center for State Innovation to become the State Innovation Exchange. It is expected to retain ALICE's library of model acts.

== See also ==
- American Legislative Exchange Council (ALEC) – an organization which produces model legislation from a conservative, pro-free market standpoint
