= Streamlined Sales Tax Project =

Former advocacy group for taxation reform

The Streamlined Sales Tax Project (SSTP), first organized in March 2000, is intended to simplify and modernize sales and use tax collection and administration in the United States. It arose in response to efforts by Congress to permanently prohibit states from collecting sales tax on online commerce. Because such a ban would have serious financial consequences for states, the SSTP began as an effort to try to minimize the many differences between the states' sales tax policies and practices. The SSTP was dissolved once the Streamlined Sales and Use Tax Agreement (SSUTA) became effective on October 1, 2005.

== Mission ==
In prior decisions regarding mail-order sales, the U.S. Supreme Court ruled in Quill Corp. v. North Dakota (1992) that mail-order retailers were not compelled to collect use tax and remit the tax to states, in part because of the complexities of doing so. (The Supreme Court overruled this case in South Dakota v. Wayfair, Inc. (2018), which stated that a state may collect sales tax on purchases made from out-of-state sellers that do not have a physical presence in the state.) With computers, however, the difficulties of doing so are much smaller today, so one remaining stumbling block lies in the variations among state sales taxes. Organizers of the SSTP hope that by ironing out differences among state taxation levels, they will remove a major roadblock to the collection of taxes on online sales and convince Congress and the courts to allow them to collect these taxes regularly. SSTP also strives to level the playing field so that local "brick-and-mortar" stores and remote sellers operate under the same rules.

== Streamlined Sales and Use Tax Agreement ==
The Streamlined Sales and Use Tax Agreement (SSUTA) focuses on four major requirements for simplification of state and local tax codes: 1) state level administration, 2) uniform tax base, 3) simplified tax rates, and 4) uniform sales sourcing rules.

State-level administration Under SSUTA, sales taxes will be remitted to a single state agency and business will no longer be required to submit multiple tax returns for each state in which they are conducting business.

Uniform tax base This would require each state to make their jurisdictions use the same tax base, meaning the same goods and services would be taxed or exempt the same way within each state. Each state would retain the choice of whether an item is taxable and at what rate.

Simplified tax rates This would require the same tax rates be applied across a state's tax jurisdictions. There can be an exception rate for food and drugs.

Uniform sales sourcing rules For in-state sales, the seller would be expected to collect the tax rate for the vendor location. This is defined as "origin" sourcing. For sales into a state from a remote seller, the vendor would collect the applicable statewide rate for the destination state. This is defined as "destination" sourcing.

== Member states ==
As of February 2017, there are 23 participating states in addition to Washington, D.C. Full member states are states that are "in compliance with the Streamlined Sales and Use Tax Agreement through its laws, rules, regulations, and policies". The full member states are Arkansas, Georgia, Indiana, Iowa, Kansas, Kentucky, Michigan, Minnesota, Nebraska, Nevada, New Jersey, North Carolina, North Dakota, Ohio, Oklahoma, Rhode Island, South Dakota, Utah, Vermont, Washington, West Virginia, Wisconsin, and Wyoming. Associate member states are states that have "achieved substantial compliance with the terms of the Agreement taken as a whole, but not necessarily each provision, measured qualitatively." Currently, Tennessee is the only associate member state.

== Certified service providers ==
The SSTP is setting up a system by which Internet e-commerce companies can voluntarily pay state taxes to the states in which their customers reside. The incentive the SSTP is offering companies is that rather than try to work out how much tax a company owes for each locality, they can instead use a CSP (certified service provider). In addition, the states that are in compliance with SSUTA (member states) will offer advantages to those sellers who use a CSP. Six companies – TaxCloud, Avalara, Taxware, AccurateTax, Sovos, and Exactor (acquired by Intuit)–have been designated as certified service providers for the SST project.

=== Amnesty ===
The Streamlined Sales Tax Project's amnesty program has caused a broad array of businesses to register using the SST system. To qualify for amnesty, a seller had to register through the SST website and remain registered for 36 months. In return for registration in all full-member states between 1 October 2005 and 30 September 2006, sellers' uncollected and unpaid sales and use taxes were completely forgiven for all periods before the registration. Registration in associate states was required within one year of those states becoming full members. This amnesty had several limits. It only applied to sales and use taxes from the seller in its capacity as a seller, not to such taxes due from the seller its capacity as a buyer. Taxes other than sales and uses taxes were not covered by this amnesty. Amnesty did not apply to any matters for which the seller had received an audit notice.

== Political debate ==
In an editorial published on 7 March 2011 the Hutchinson News of Kansas wrote, "Kansas has been wise to be among 24 states that are part of the Streamlined Sales and Use Tax Agreement. These states have made their sales tax rules and definitions uniform, creating an environment in which retailers can collect taxes on remote sales to these states. Computer software easily calculates sales tax for locations in these states." Moving on to the topic of how the current tax treatment of online sales affects traditional retailers the Hutchison News writes, "Besides the loss of tax revenue -- at a time when government least can afford a leaky tax collection bucket -- the failure to require sales taxes on Internet purchases remains a significant disadvantage for traditional brick-and-mortar businesses on our main streets. And it also makes a regressive tax even more so, because only those with credit cards and Internet access can do business online."

== See also ==
- Tax compliance software
