= Use tax =

Type of tax in the United States

A use tax is a type of tax levied in the United States by numerous state governments. It is essentially the same as a sales tax but is applied not where a product or service was sold but where a merchant bought a product or service and then converted it for its own use, without having paid tax when it was initially purchased. Use taxes are functionally equivalent to sales taxes. They are typically levied on the use, storage, enjoyment, or other consumption of tangible personal property within the state that has not been subject to a sales tax.

== Introduction ==
Use tax is assessed upon tangible personal property and taxable services purchased by a resident or entity doing business in the taxing state upon the use, storage, enjoyment, or consumption of the good or service, regardless of origin of the purchase. Use taxes are designed to discourage the purchase of products that are not subject to the sales tax within a taxing jurisdiction. Use tax may be applied to purchases from out-of-state vendors that are not required to collect tax on their sales within the state. The use tax imposes a compensating tax equal in amount to the sales tax that would have been imposed on the sale of the property if the sale had occurred within the state's taxing jurisdiction. The use tax is typically assessed at the same rate as the sales tax that would have been owed, and generally the taxability of the good or service does not vary. However, there are instances in which the sales tax rate and the use tax rate differ.

For example, a resident of Massachusetts, with a 6.25% "sales and use tax" on certain goods and services, purchases non-exempt goods or services in New Hampshire for use, storage, or other consumption in Massachusetts. Under New Hampshire law, the New Hampshire vendor collects no sales tax on the goods, but the Massachusetts purchaser/user must still pay 6.25% of the sales price directly to the Massachusetts Department of Revenue as a use tax. If the same goods are purchased in a US state that collects sales tax for such goods at the time of purchase, whatever taxes were paid by the purchaser to that state can be deducted (as a tax credit) from the 6.25% owed for subsequent use, storage, or consumption in Massachusetts. For example, if the Massachusetts resident had driven over the border to Vermont and paid 6% sales tax to purchase an item, only the difference of 0.25% would be due in Massachusetts. With few exceptions, no state's vendors will charge the native state's sales tax on goods shipped out of state, meaning all goods ordered from out of state are essentially free of sales tax. The purchaser is therefore required to declare and pay the use tax to their home state on these ordered goods.

The assessing jurisdiction may require the use tax to be paid annually, but some states require monthly payments. For example, where a Vermont resident has not paid at least 6% sales tax on property brought in for use in the state, Vermont law requires filing a tax return (Form SU-452 and payment) by the 20th day of the month following non-exempt purchases to avoid a $50 late fee, a 5% penalty per month, to a maximum of 25%, plus statutory interest on the unpaid tax and penalties.

There are currently over 14,000 tax jurisdictions in the U.S., and many of them have varying taxability rules for services. Given the number of jurisdictions, the source of the sale may also need to be examined to ensure the tax is applied and remitted appropriately. For instance, some states may require a use tax based on where the service was provided, while others may require one based on where the "benefit" is received. In traditional repair and maintenance services, these locations will typically be the same; with complex technology transactions, they are often different.

In most cases, this complexity is part of the underlying sales tax laws. Still, while a brick-and-mortar store has to deal with only the sales tax laws of its own location, remote sellers have to deal with the use tax laws of many jurisdictions—up to every US state and locality that assesses them, if the company has a presence or "nexus" in every state (as large "brick-and-mortar" sellers like Wal-Mart and Best Buy do).

== Self-assessment ==
The use tax, like the sales tax, is assessed on the end consumer of tangible property or services, but the difference lies in who calculates the tax and how it is accounted for. The seller collects the sales tax, acting as an agent of the state, and remits it to the state on behalf of the end consumer. On the other hand, the use tax is self-assessed and remitted by the end consumer. From an entity's perspective, the shift from sales to use tax is the equivalent of shifting from an expense account (profit and loss statement implication) to a liability account (balance sheet implication).

To illustrate sales tax, if company XYZ, Inc. purchased $40 of office supplies from an in-state vendor that collected $10 of sales tax:

| General ledger account | Debit | Credit |
|---|---|---|
| Office supplies | $50 | |
| Cash | | $50 |

To illustrate use tax, if company XYZ, Inc. purchased $40 of office supplies from an out-of-state vendor that did not collect sales tax, use tax is self-assessed:

| General ledger account | Debit | Credit |
|---|---|---|
| Office supplies | $50 | |
| Cash | | $40 |
| Use Tax Payable | | $10 |

The US Census Bureau reported in 2014, $271.3 billion in sales and gross receipts were collected by the 45 states that collect sales and use taxes; 33 of the 45 states increased collections year over year. Sales and use taxes combined account for 32% of all taxes collected by all states, second only to personal income tax collections. The states themselves maintain that use tax collections are the second leading cause of tax deficiencies under audit.

== Enforcement ==
In 2007, 22 states, including New York, California, Ohio, and Virginia, have included an entry on their state individual income tax return for taxpayers to calculate an amount for use tax liability voluntarily. Taxpayers, however, have been reluctant to pay taxes to the state. A few of these states have tried another approach by pre-determining each taxpayer's tax liability using a tax table based on the individual's adjusted gross income. For example, a Michigan taxpayer with $45,000 of income can use the state's use tax table to estimate their use tax liability as $36. However, this table is limited to purchases under $1,000 and may be challenged during an audit. For purchases over $1,000, the taxpayer must calculate the tax for each item and add it to the use tax amount from the table. States using this method have seen an increase in voluntary compliance compared with states that have taxpayers calculate the use tax themselves.

As the amount of e-commerce sales continues to rise ($34 billion for just the second quarter of 2008) states recognize that the key to collecting these taxes rests not only in educating the individual taxpayer but also in coordinating their efforts with other states. Currently, there are 19 full member states and 3 associate member states that belong to the Streamlined Sales Tax Project (SSTP). The SSTP assists states in collecting sales and use taxes by registering merchants who charge out-of-state consumers the appropriate state sales tax and remit it to that state through a certified service provider. SSTP has also been at the forefront of efforts to urge Congress to amend the laws to make the collection of sales tax less burdensome. In fact, in May 2013, the United States Senate passed a bill that would give the states authority to require sellers to collect sales tax on out-of-state sales. The House of Representatives must still pass the bill and send it to the President of the United States before it becomes law.

States may also work with adjacent states via interstate use tax agreements. These agreements allow states to exchange tax audit records from businesses that have shipped goods to out-of-state consumers. Reciprocal states will then use those records and send a tax bill, including penalties and interest, to the individual taxpayer.

States have also pursued their collection efforts through the court system. In 2007, a California appeals court ruled that Borders Online owed California sales tax for online purchases that the store failed to collect from 1998 to 1999 since customers were able to return merchandise bought online to Borders' retail stores in California.

== Exemptions ==
Exemptions are typically offered based upon the type of customer:

1. Resale - Resale certificates are the most commonly used of the sales tax exemption certificates. Sales taxes are applied to retail sales, so sales intended for resale are exempt to avoid double taxation. Reselling and wholesaling account for $844 billion of the American GDP, or 3.3%.
2. Manufacturing - Manufacturing exemption certificates generally apply to manufacturers of tangible personal property, industrial processors, and refineries that produce such property for retail sale. Each state outlines specific equipment and/or consumables that are eligible for the exemption. Estimates show (as discussed further in the Statistics Section) that $2.08 trillion, or 12.5% of GDP, is associated with the manufacturing sector.
3. Agricultural - Agricultural exemptions are generally applied to sales of tangible property that will be utilized in farming, raising livestock, and maintaining agricultural land. According to the US Department of Agriculture, $412.3 billion of GDP relates to agriculture, and $5.816 trillion in tangible assets are used for agricultural purposes. Estimates derived from annualized, stratified gross sales of sampled states with exemption certificates show that $45 million of state-reported gross sales are associated with the agriculture sector.
4. Government - The federal government is exempt from sales and use taxes per federal statute. Additionally, many states (all except Arizona) exempt their state governments by state statute. Not all states require a certificate for government exemption. Estimates show that approximately $19 trillion in gross sales are associated with federal and state governments, which ties to the actual reported GDP.
5. Exempt Organizations - Exempt organizations are generally defined as those in Internal Revenue Code §501(c). Additionally, many states require the Internal Revenue Code letter establishing the organization as exempt as a supplement to the exemption certificate. Estimates indicate that approximately $1.5 billion in gross sales is associated with exempt organizations.
6. Construction contracting - construction and/or capital improvements may also be exempt per state statute or regulation. There may be different treatments for new construction and capital improvements. Construction contractors may be exempt from paying sales tax upon purchasing, but will be required to pay use tax upon incorporation into real property. Construction accounts for $520.3 billion of GDP.
7. Aircraft - Aircraft, aircraft parts, and aircraft labor are generally exempt because aircraft are used in multiple states. Air services account for $63.3 billion of GDP.

Exemptions are also offered upon the usage of the property. For instance, the most common exemptions are for resellers, who purchase goods to resell and are therefore not the end consumer. Manufacturers are also exempt when they purchase goods that are ultimately incorporated into tangible personal property destined for the open market. Again, the manufacturer is not the ultimate consumer of the good. Several states also offer Direct Pay Permits, which are issued to manufacturers and allow them to purchase goods intended for incorporation into tangible personal property. Such manufacturers may also use the same goods or parts to repair and maintain the end consumer's previously purchased products. Thus, the burden of tax liability shifts from the seller of the goods to the manufacturer. The manufacturer will purchase all goods tax-exempt under the Direct Pay Permit, but is required to accrue and remit tax on goods taken from inventory (intended for incorporation into tangible personal property held for sale) and consumed by the manufacturer. That is done because the manufacturer has better visibility into the use of its property and is therefore better positioned to determine whether use tax should apply.

=== Direct pay permits ===
Direct pay permits are generally used by manufacturers that purchase tangible personal property for resale and their own use. They usually require the seller to exempt the purchases and pay use tax upon removal from inventory. Manufacturers will either use an exemption certificate or will rely on a state-issued direct pay permit/agreement.

A direct payment permit allows a business to purchase taxable goods and services without paying tax to the vendor and to remit the correct use tax directly to the DRS. That allows businesses the necessary time to determine how much tax to assess on their purchases.

=== Burden of proof ===
The ultimate burden of responsibility for verifying the exemption's validity lies with the certificate issuer. That is, the reseller or manufacturer who provided the certificate to the seller has the burden of proof and the financial responsibility for the tax, penalties, and interest if the proof is not met. The seller, as a collection agent for the state, may be held liable for uncollected taxes if the burden of proof is not met, as outlined by state law and/or regulation.

There are two principles of proof used by states:

Good faith acceptance is defined as "total absence of intention to seek unfair advantage or to defraud another party; honest intention to fulfil one's obligations; observance of reasonable standards of fair dealing". In practice, that translates to accepting a completed certificate that appears reasonable on its face. For example, for a widget manufacturer, reasonableness would include purchasing raw materials such as metals and plastics, as well as tools. The purchase of children's toys or clothing would be unreasonable for the same manufacturer of widgets.

Strict liability acceptance is defined as "Liability that does not depend on actual negligence or intent to harm, but that is based on the breach of an absolute duty to make something safe". Then, the liability of the seller is relieved upon receipt of the certificate; the seller has no obligation to validate the statements made by the purchaser.

== See also ==
- Interstate commerce clause
- Tax exemption
- Tax holiday
- Tax-free shopping
- Taxing and Spending Clause, specifically Article I, Section 9, Clause 5
- Quill Corp. v. North Dakota
