= Sales tax =

Tax on the sales of certain goods and services

A sales tax is a tax paid to a governing body for the sales of certain goods and services. Usually, laws allow the seller to collect funds for the tax from the consumer at the point of purchase.

When a tax on goods or services is paid to a governing body directly by a consumer, it is usually called a use tax. Often, laws provide for the exemption of certain goods or services from sales and use tax, such as food, education, and medicines. A value-added tax (VAT) collected on goods and services is related to a sales tax. See Comparison with sales tax for key differences.

== Types ==
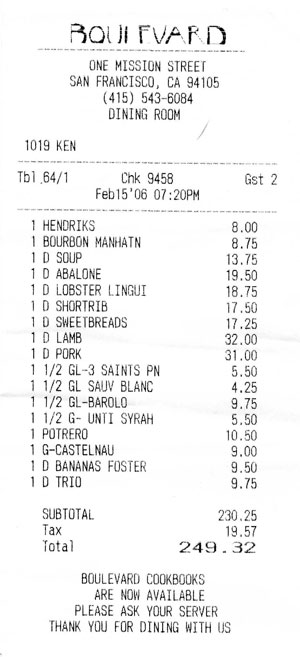
Cash register receipt showing sales tax of 8.5%

Conventional or retail sales tax is levied on the sale of a good to its final end-user and is charged every time that item is sold retail. Sales to businesses that later resell the goods are not charged the tax. A purchaser who is not an end-user is usually issued a "resale certificate" by the taxing authority and required to provide the certificate (or its ID number) to a seller at the point of purchase, along with a statement that the item is for resale. The tax is otherwise charged on each item sold to purchasers without such a certificate and who are under the jurisdiction of the taxing authority.

Other types of sales taxes, or similar taxes:

- Manufacturers' sales tax, a tax on sales of tangible personal property by manufacturers and producers
- Wholesale sales tax, a tax on sales of wholesale of tangible personal property when in a form packaged and labeled ready for shipment or delivery to final users and consumers
- Retail sales tax, a tax on sales of retail of tangible personal property to final consumers and industrial users
- Gross receipts taxes, levied on all sales of a business. They have been criticized for their "cascading" or "pyramiding" effect, in which an item is taxed more than once as it makes its way from production to final retail sale.
- Excise taxes, applied to a narrow range of products, such as gasoline or alcohol, usually imposed on the producer or wholesaler rather than on the retail seller.
- Use tax, imposed directly on the consumer of goods purchased without sales tax, generally items purchased from a vendor not under the jurisdiction of the taxing authority (such as a vendor in another state). Use taxes are commonly imposed by states with a sales tax but are usually enforced only for large items such as automobiles and boats.
- Securities turnover excise tax, a tax on the trade of securities.
- Value added tax (VAT), in which tax is charged on all sales, thus avoiding the need for a system of resale certificates. Tax cascading is avoided by applying the tax only to the difference ("value added") between the price paid by the first purchaser and the price paid by each subsequent purchaser of the same item.
- FairTax, a proposed federal sales tax, intended to replace the US federal income tax.
- Turnover tax, similar to a sales tax, but applied to intermediate and possibly capital goods as an indirect tax.

== Implementation ==
Most countries in the world have sales taxes or value-added taxes at all or several of the national, state, county, or city government levels. Countries in Western Europe, especially in Scandinavia, have some of the world's highest valued-added taxes. Norway, Denmark and Sweden have higher VATs at 25%, Hungary has the highest at 27% although reduced rates are used in some cases, as for groceries, art, books and newspapers.

Globally, conventional sales taxes are increasingly being replaced by value-added taxes (VAT), which now account for approximately 20% of worldwide tax revenue. Over 140 countries have adopted VAT systems, leaving the United States as one of the few nations that continues to utilize a conventional sales tax model.

How sales taxes work across the U.S. involves 45 states that impose a statewide sales tax. Additionally, 38 states allow local sales taxes, which can significantly increase the total rate. Even states with moderate statewide rates can have high combined state and local rates. In some jurisdictions of the United States, there are multiple levels of government which each impose a sales tax. For example, sales tax in Chicago (Cook County), Illinois is 10.25%, consisting of 6.25% state, 1.25% city, 1.75% county and 1% regional transportation authority. Chicago also has the Metropolitan Pier and Exposition Authority tax on food and beverage of 1% (which means dining out is taxed at 11.25%). In Baton Rouge, Louisiana, the tax is 9.45%, which is 4.45% state & 5% local. In Los Angeles it is 9.5%, which is 7.25% state & 2.25% county.

Sales and use taxes in California are made up of various state, county and city taxes. The state tax is "imposed upon all retailers" for the "privilege of selling tangible personal property at retail". Strictly speaking, only the retailer is responsible for the payment of the tax; when a retailer adds this tax to the purchase price, the consumer is merely reimbursing the retailer by contractual agreement. When consumers purchase goods from out-of-state (in which case the seller owes no tax to California) the consumer is required to pay a "use tax" identical to the sales tax. Use tax is levied upon the "storage, use, or other consumption in this state of tangible personal property". Consumers are responsible for declaring these purchases in the same filing as their annual state income tax, but it is rare for them to do so. An exception is out-of-state purchase of automobiles. Then, use tax is collected by the state as part of registering the vehicle in California.

== Electronic commerce ==
Sales tax on online purchasers operates in a different manner. Generally, there are four types of electronic commerce: intermediaries, retail, business-to-business and media, all of which are affected by consumer response to sales tax. However, while consumers are technically supposed to pay a sales tax when it comes to cross state border transactions, the practicality of enforcing it is impossible. As a result, online retail stores have had a distinct advantage in that they do not have to charge a sales tax. That has led many economists to examine consumer sensitivity when it comes to sales taxes. While some researchers have concluded a high elasticity of online purchase probability with respect to sales tax at around 2.3, others have found smaller figures of around 0.5. That means that enforcing an online sales tax would have negligible effects on aggregate sales.

== Effects ==
Economists at the Organisation for Economic Co-operation and Development studied the effects of various types of taxes on the economic growth of developed nations within the OECD and found that sales taxes are one of the least harmful taxes for growth.

Because the rate of a sales tax does not change based on a person's income or wealth, sales taxes are generally considered regressive. However, it has been suggested that any regressive effect of a sales tax could be mitigated, e.g., by excluding rent, or by exempting "necessary" items, such as food, clothing and medicines. Investopedia defines a regressive tax as "[a] tax that takes a larger percentage from low-income people than from high-income people. A regressive tax is generally a tax that is applied uniformly. This means that it hits lower-income individuals harder".

=== Effects on local economies ===
Higher sales taxes have been shown to have many different effects on local economies. With higher taxes, more consumers are starting to reconsider where they shop, according to a study conducted in Minnesota and Wisconsin, where the sales tax was raised on cigarettes. Effects of higher sales tax were not shown immediately in sales, but about six months after the taxes were raised. High sales taxes can be used to relieve property taxes but only when property taxes are lowered subsequently. Studies that have shown this correlation were conducted in Georgia by cities raising sales tax and lowering property taxes. To combat sales loss, a city must be able to import consumers to buy goods locally. If local sales taxes are too high, consumers will travel to other areas to purchase goods.

=== Enforcement of tax on remote sales ===
In the United States, every state with a sales tax law has a use tax component in that law applying to purchases from out-of-state mail order, catalog and e-commerce vendors, a category also known as "remote sales". As e-commerce sales have grown in recent years, noncompliance with use tax has had a growing impact on state revenues. The Congressional Budget Office estimated that uncollected use taxes on remote sales in 2003 could be as high as $20.4 billion. Uncollected use tax on remote sales was projected to run as high as $54.8 billion for 2011.

Enforcement of the tax on remote sales, however, is difficult. Unless the vendor has a physical location, or nexus, within a state, the vendor cannot be required to collect tax for that state. This limitation was defined as part of the Dormant Commerce Clause by the Supreme Court in the 1967 decision on National Bellas Hess v. Illinois. An attempt to require a Delaware e-commerce vendor to collect North Dakota tax was overturned by the court in the 1992 decision on Quill Corp. v. North Dakota. A number of observers and commentators have argued, so far unsuccessfully, for a Congressional adoption of this physical presence nexus test.

The Internet Tax Freedom Act of 1998 established a commission to study the possibility of internet taxation, but the commission did not make any formal recommendations. In a report issued in 2003, the Congressional Budget Office warned of the economic burden of a "multiplicity of tax systems, particularly for smaller firms".

In an effort to reduce the burden of compliance with the tax laws of multiple jurisdictions, the Streamlined Sales Tax Project was organized in March 2000. Cooperative efforts in this project by 44 state governments and the District of Columbia eventually produced the Streamlined Sales and Use Tax Agreement in 2010. This agreement establishes standards necessary for simplified and uniform sales tax laws. As of December 2010, 24 states had passed legislation conforming with the agreement. Whether the Streamlined Sales Tax can actually be applied to remote sales ultimately depends upon Congressional support, because the 1992 Quill v. North Dakota decision determined that only the U.S. Congress has the authority to enact interstate taxes.

=== Effect of electronic commerce ===
Electronic commerce business can also be affected by consumption taxes. It can be separated into four categories: retail, intermediaries, business-to-business and media (Goldfarb 2008). These categories were affected varying degrees. The intermediaries were affected by the retail sales tax since it provides platforms for transitions between different parties (such as the Amazon marketplace). Business-to-Business transactions will be placed in different circumstances by whether the case will be taxed in the US. Electronic commerce goods are usually not taxed the same especially across the stats in the US. Different states have their own sales tax regulations, for example, some states use their standard sales taxes law for the digital goods, and some of the states have specific laws for them. It is difficult to enforce the taxes on electronic commerce especially for digital goods that trade across different countries.

The effect that a sales tax has on consumer and producer behavior is rather large. The price elasticity of demand for online products is high, meaning that consumers are price sensitive and their demand will significantly change with small changes in price. This means that the tax burden lies primarily with the producer. To avoid altering demand, the producer will either avoid the tax if possible by relocating their fulfillment centers to areas without a high sales tax or they will internalize the cost of the sales tax by charging consumers the same price but paying for the tax from their profits.

== History ==
=== Early examples ===
A tax imposed on the sale of goods is depicted on the walls of Egyptians tombs, which have been dated as far back as 2000 BC. These paintings describe the collection of tax for specific commodities, such as cooking oil.

Sales tax amounts, measured in drachmas at a rate of one percent, were recorded in a separate column of a record prepared for the auction of 16 slaves in Piraeus, Greece in 415 BC. Nearby Athens collected duties on the import and export of commodities, recorded at a rate of two percent in 399 BC. At that period of time, Athens did not rely on government agencies to collect its taxes; the responsibility was delegated to the highest bidder, a practice known as tax farming.

The Roman emperor Augustus collected funds for his military aerarium in AD 6 with a one percent general sales tax, known as the centesima rerum venalium (hundredth of the value of everything sold). The Roman sales tax was later reduced to a half percent (ducentesima) by Tiberius, then abolished completely by Caligula.

=== In the United States ===
Although the United States government has never used a general sales tax, an excise tax on whiskey enacted in 1791 was one of its first fund raising efforts. The unpopularity of this tax with farmers on the western frontier led to the Whiskey Rebellion in 1794.

Federal and state sales taxes in the United States remained selective, rather than general, through the 19th century. However, excise taxes were applied to so many specific commodities during the Civil War that they functioned collectively as a general sales tax.

The first broad-based, general sales taxes in the United States were enacted by Kentucky and Mississippi in 1930, although Kentucky repealed its sales tax in 1936.

The federal government's per-gallon tax of gasoline (beginning at one cent per gallon in 1932) and per-package tax of cigarettes ($1.01 per package since 2009) are the most well-known current sales taxes administered by the federal government.

Twenty-two other states began imposing general sales taxes later in the 1930s, followed by six in the 1940s and five in the 1950s. Kentucky re-enacted its sales tax law in 1960. Eleven more states enacted sales tax laws during the 1960s, with Vermont as the last in 1969. Five states currently do not have general sales taxes: Alaska, Delaware, Montana, New Hampshire, and Oregon.

The 2010 health care reform law imposed a 10 percent federal sales tax on indoor tanning services, effective July 1, 2010. Unlike previous federal excise taxes, this tax is collected directly from the consumer by the seller and based on the sale price rather than a quantity. However, the new tax is selective rather than general, applying only to a specific service.

=== In Canada ===
Canada uses a value-added federal Goods and Services Tax with a rate of 5 percent, effective since January 1, 2008. Alberta, Yukon, Northwest Territories, and Nunavut have no territorial sales taxes, so only the GST is collected. Other provinces have either a Provincial Sales Tax (PST) or the Harmonized Sales Tax (HST), which is a single, blended combination of the GST and PST.

== Sales tax mitigation ==
Businesses can reduce the impact of sales tax for themselves and their customers by planning for the tax consequences of all activities. Sales tax reduction or mitigation strategies can include the following:

- Designing invoices to reduce the taxable portion of a sale transaction. In Maryland, for example, a delivery charge is exempt if it is stated separately from handling and other taxable charges.
- New facilities. Jurisdictions with no sales tax or broad exemptions for certain types of business operations would be an obvious consideration in selecting a site for a new manufacturing plant, warehouse, or administrative office.
- Delivery location. For a business operating in several jurisdictions, choosing the best location in which to take delivery can reduce or eliminate the sales tax liability. That is particularly important for an item to be sold or used in another jurisdiction with a lower tax rate or an exemption for that item. Businesses should consider whether a temporary storage exemption applies to merchandise initially accepted in a jurisdiction with a higher tax rate.
- Periodic review of record-keeping procedures related to sales and use tax. Proper supporting detail, including exemption and resale certificates, invoices and other records must be available to defend the company in the event of a sales and use tax audit. Without proper documentation, a seller may be held liable for tax not collected from a buyer.

== See also ==
- Consumption tax
- Excise tax
- Goods and Services Tax (Australia)
- Local option sales tax
- Sales Tax Audit
- Sales and use taxes in California
- Sales taxes in Canada
- Sales taxes in the United States
- Streamlined Sales Tax Project
- Value-added tax
