= Privilege tax =

A privilege tax is a tax levied in exchange for a privilege or license granted to the taxpayer. The fee for registering a motor vehicle is one example of a privilege tax.

Many taxes on businesses are characterized as privilege taxes. For example, Arizona's transaction privilege tax is a gross receipts tax on business. In the 1911 case of Flint v. Stone Tracy Co., the United States Supreme Court upheld the constitutionality of a corporate income tax, determining that it was an indirect tax on the privilege of doing business as a corporation.
