= TPT =

TPT may refer to:

- TPT (software), Time Partition Testing
- Transaction privilege tax, in Arizona, US
- Twin Cities Public Television, Minneapolis–St. Paul, Minnesota, US
- Tara Palmer-Tomkinson (1971–2017), English television personality
- Tramway de Pithiviers à Toury, a French railway
- Totul pentru tara, a Romanian fascist party 1935-1940
- Two-part tariff for a product
- The Powder Toy, falling sand game
- The Passion Translation, Christian Bible Translation
- TransPennine Trains, British train operator
- Trans Pennine Trail, long-distance path in Northern England
- Triphalangeal thumb, congenital malformation
- Tpt., an abbreviation for Trumpet used in musical scores
