= Taxation in New Mexico =

Overview of taxation in the U.S. state of New Mexico

Taxation in New Mexico comprises the taxation programs of the U.S state of New Mexico. All taxes are administered at the state and city levels by the New Mexico Taxation and Revenue Department, a state agency. The principal taxes levied include state income tax, a state gross receipts tax, gross receipts taxes in local jurisdictions, state and local property taxes, and several taxes related to production and processing of oil, gas, and other natural resources.

New Mexico is among the "tax-friendly" states of the U.S., offering numerous economic incentives and tax breaks on personal and corporate income. It does not have inheritance tax, estate tax or franchise taxes. While New Mexico does not have a state sales tax it does have a statewide "gross receipts tax", which is commonly passed on to the consumer by businesses just like a normal sales tax. Its state income tax is the highest in the American Southwest outside California and higher than every state bordering it, ranging from 1.7% to a maximum of 5.9%.

== Income tax ==
New Mexico residents are subject to the state's personal income tax. Additionally, the personal income tax applies to nonresidents who work in the state or derive income from property there. Regular military salaries of New Mexico residents serving in the U.S. military are subject to the income tax, but since 2007, active-duty military salaries have been exempt from the state income tax.

Personal income tax rates for New Mexico range from 1.7% to 5.9%, within five income brackets. The individual income tax rates are listed in the table below.

| Rate | Income |
Heads of household, widow(er)s, and married persons filing jointly
| 1.7% | $8,000 or less |
| $136 plus 3.2% of excess over $8,000 | $8,001 – $16,000 |
| $392 plus 4.7% of excess over $16,000 | $16,001 – $24,000 |
| $768 plus 4.9% of excess over $24,000 | $24,001 – $315,000 |
| $15,027 plus 5.9% of excess over $315,000 | $315,000 or more |
Singles and estates or trusts
| 1.7% | $5,500 or less |
| $93.50 plus 3.2% of excess over $5,500 | $5,501 – $11,000 |
| $269.50 plus 4.7% of excess over $11,000 | $11,001 – $16,000 |
| $504.50 plus 4.9% of excess over $16,000 | $16,001 – $210,000 |
| $10,010.50 plus 5.9% of excess over $210,000 | $210,000 or more |
Married persons filing separately
| 1.7% | $4,000 or less |
| $68 plus 3.2% of excess over $4,000 | $4,001 – $8,000 |
| $196 plus 4.7% of excess over $8,000 | $8,001 – $12,000 |
| $384 plus 4.9% of excess over $12,000 | $12,001 – $157,500 |
| $7,513.50 plus 5.9% of excess over $157,500 | $157,500 or more |

Uniquely, New Mexico has an income tax exemption for centenarians since tax year 2002, provided that they turn 100 (or older) at the end of the tax year they claim for exemption and they're not claimed as a dependent by another New Mexico taxpayer. Unmarried centenarians are not required to file a return unless they want to claim rebates and credits available for low-income filers. As New Mexico is a community property state, married centenarians filing jointly or separately may exempt half of all community income and all of their separate income. Those reporting an exemption for more or less than 50% of total joint income are required to attach a statement to their returns showing a correct division of community property along with separate income and payments.

Corporations that generate income from activities or sources in New Mexico and that are required to file federal income tax returns as corporations must pay corporate income tax to the state. Corporate income is taxed at the rate of 4.8% for the first $500,000, 6.4% for the next $500,000 (up to total income of $1 million), and 7.6% for income above the first million.

== Gross receipts tax ==
GRT rates by county (not including cities)

New Mexico does not have a state sales tax. However, the state imposes a gross receipts tax (GRT) on many business transactions. This resembles a sales tax, but unlike most states' sales taxes it applies to services, as well as tangible goods. Normally, the provider or seller passes the tax on to the purchaser, but legal incidence and burden apply to the business, as an excise tax.

At the state level, gross receipts on most types of transactions are taxed at a rate of 5.125%. Local jurisdictions also levy gross receipt taxes at rates that vary around the state. The lowest combined state and local GRT rate, as of 2012–13, is 5.5% in unincorporated Lea County. The highest combined rate is 8.6875%, in Taos Ski Valley. Albuquerque, the state's largest city, has a combined rate of 7.7875%.

The gross receipts of state and local governments other than school districts are taxed by the state at a rate of 5%. Governmental receipts typically subject to this tax include revenues from:

- trash collection and disposal services,
- sewer service,
- sale of water
- sale of tangible personal property, other than water, from facilities open to the general public revenues sale of personal property
- fees charged for parking or docking of vehicles, airplanes, and boats.

== Property tax ==
Property tax is imposed on real property by the state, by counties, and by school districts. Personal-use personal property is not subject to property taxation, but property tax is levied on most business-use personal property. The taxable value of property is one-third of the assessed value. A tax rate of about 30 mills is applied to the taxable value, resulting in an effective tax rate of about 1%. In the 2005 tax year the average millage was about 26.47 for residential property and 29.80 for non-residential property. Assessed values of residences cannot be increased by more than 3% per year unless the residence is remodeled or sold. Property tax deductions are available for military veterans and heads of household.

== Natural resources taxes ==
=== Oil and natural gas taxes ===
Five New Mexico taxes are specifically applicable to producers of oil and natural gas.

Oil and gas production is a significant source of revenue for the state. As of 2000, taxes and royalties on oil and natural gas production together accounted for more than 25% of the revenue to the state's general fund. The balance in New Mexico's Severance Tax and Land Grant Permanent Funds, the earnings from which are dedicated to funding of schools and some state government operations, was almost entirely derived from these same sources. A 2009 analysis found that New Mexico was receiving less revenue from the combination of its oil and gas taxes and royalties for oil and gas from public lands than most other U.S. states with substantial production of hydrocarbon fuels. This discrepancy was explained by the caps that state law placed on the maximum prices of oil and natural gas that could be subject to taxation. The maximum tax for oil was based on a price of $18 per barrel, but the market price rose to $112 per barrel as of May 2011. The maximum tax for natural gas was based on a price of $1.35 per 1000 cubic feet, but the market price for that volume of gas in May 2011 was $4.35. Other states were receiving much more tax and royalty revenue as a result of these high prices. Legislation enacted in 2010 established a rate of 0.24% (an increase from 0.19%) for the oil and gas conservation tax rate on oil if the average price of West Texas Intermediate crude oil was more than $70 per barrel in the previous quarter.

=== Resources Excise Tax ===
New Mexico's Resources Excise Tax Act of 1978 established taxes on in-state production of natural resources, including timber, timber products, and minerals, except for oil, natural gas, liquid hydrocarbons, helium, carbon dioxide, and other non-hydrocarbon gases.

The resources tax is a severance tax that applies to the extraction of natural resources. The amount of the tax is based on the taxable value of the severed resource. The tax on potash extraction is 0.5% of the resource value; molybdenum extraction is taxed at 0.125%; and all other extracted resources are taxed at 0.75%.

The second tax, the processors tax, applies to the processing of natural resources. It also is based on the taxable value of the natural resource. Timber processing is taxed at 0.375% of taxable value; processing of potash and molybdenum is taxed at 0.125%; and processing of all other resources is taxed at 0.75%.

When extraction or processing is conducted by someone other than the owner of the resource, the same tax rates apply, but the tax is designated a "service tax" under the Resources Excise Tax Act.

Revenue from these taxes goes to the state's general fund.
