= Michigan Proposal 1 =

Michigan Proposal 1 may refer to:

- 2008 Michigan Proposal 1, the Michigan Compassionate Care Initiative
- 2015 Michigan Proposal 1, referendum on tax-related statutes and constitutional amendment
- 2018 Michigan Proposal 1, marijuana legalization initiative
- 2020 Michigan Proposal 1, oil and gas revenue initiative
