= 2015 United States ballot measures =

- April 7 to November 3, 2016

Part of the 2015 United States elections

In 2015, there were several important propositions on the ballot across the United States.

== By state ==
=== Colorado ===
| Origin | Status | Measure | Description (Result of a "yes" vote) | Date | Yes | No |
|---|---|---|---|---|---|---|
| Legislature | Approved | Colorado Marijuana TABOR Refund Measure, Proposition BB | Allow the state to retain $66 million in collected marijuana tax revenue. | Nov 3 | 847,380; 69.39% | 373,734; 30.61% |

=== Louisiana ===
| Origin | Status | Measure | Description (Result of a "yes" vote) | Date | Yes | No |
|---|---|---|---|---|---|---|
| Legislature | Failed | Louisiana Budget and Transportation Stabilization Trust, Amendment 1 | Rename the Budget Stabilization Fund, also known as the Rainy Day Fund, to the Budget and Transportation Stabilization Trust (BTST) and subdivide it into two subfunds. Ensuring that after the state collected $750 million from mineral taxes and royalties in a fiscal year, revenue would then have gone into the first subfund, the Budget Stabilization Subfund, until it reached $500 million. Once fully filling this first subfund, further revenue would have been deposited into the second subfund, the Transportation Stabilization Subfund, at the beginning of the next fiscal year until it reached $500 million. After the second subfund was full, any excess revenue would have been deposited into the state's general fund. | Oct 24 | 466,140; 47.49% | 515,366; 52.51% |
| Legislature | Approved | Louisiana Transportation Infrastructure Bank, Amendment 2 | Establish a state transportation infrastructure bank, allowing the transportation infrastructure bank to loan, pledge, guarantee or donate public funds to transportation projects. | Oct 24 | 528,863; 52.86% | 471,636; 47.14% |
| Legislature | Failed | Louisiana Content of Fiscal Legislative Sessions, Amendment 3 | Replace the Legislature's ability to "dedicate revenue" during fiscal legislative sessions with the broader "legislate with regard to the dedication of revenue". Additionally, replace the Legislature's ability to "levy or authorize a new tax, increase an existing tax, and legislate with regard to tax exemptions, exclusions, deductions, reductions, repeals, or credits" with the broader "legislate with regard to taxes... [and] rebates." | Oct 24 | 452,260; 45.70% | 537,391; 54.30% |
| Legislature | Approved | Louisiana Taxation of Property Owned by Another State, Amendment 4 | Provide that property and land within Louisiana owned by states and local governments other than Louisiana and its political subdivisions do not receive the public property exemption from ad valorem property taxation. | Oct 24 | 509,647; 51.42% | 481,488; 48.58% |

=== Maine ===
| Origin | Status | Measure | Description (Result of a "yes" vote) | Date | Yes | No |
|---|---|---|---|---|---|---|
| Legislature | Approved | Maine Question 1, Changes to Clean Election Act and Campaign Finance Measure | Increase funding for the Maine Clean Elections Fund, increase penalties for violating campaign finance disclosure rules, adjust political ad disclosure rules and allow candidates to qualify for additional funds. | Nov 3 | 119,992; 54.96% | 98343; 45.04% |
| Bond Issue | Approved | Maine Affordable Housing for Low-Income Seniors Bond, Question 2 | Issue a $15 million bond for housing construction projects for low-income seniors. | Nov 3 | 151,695; 69.31% | 67,160; 30.69% |
| Bond Issue | Approved | Maine Transportation Bond, Question 3 | Issue a $85 million bond for transportation projects. | Nov 3 | 159,050; 72.74% | 59,595; 27.26% |

=== Michigan ===
| Origin | Status | Measure | Description (Result of a "yes" vote) | Date | Yes | No |
|---|---|---|---|---|---|---|
| Legislature | Failed | Michigan Sales Tax Increase for Transportation Amendment, Proposal 1 | Increase revenue for transportation funding by increasing the fuel tax to 41.7 cents or 14.9 percent of a gallon of fuel's base value, whichever is greater. Require revenue from the fuel tax to be allocated to the transportation fund, eliminated registration fee discounts, increased heavy commercial vehicle registration fees and created an electric vehicle surcharge. eliminate the sales and use tax on fuel for vehicles. Increase the sales and use tax on non-fuel items from 6 percent to 7 percent. Allow municipalities to finance road projects through competitive bidding, required performance-based evaluations for state projects, and required warranties for road construction projects costing more than $1 million. Increase the state's Earned Income Tax Credit from 6 percent to 20 percent. | May 5 | 349,862; 19.93% | 1,406,019; 80.07% |

=== Mississippi ===
| Origin | Status | Measure | Description (Result of a "yes" vote) | Date | Yes | No |
|---|---|---|---|---|---|---|
| Citizens | Failed | Mississippi Public School Support Amendment | Signifies that the voter wanted either Initiative 42 or Alternative 42 to pass. | May 5 | 332,738; 48.34% | 355,566; 51.66% |
| Citizens | Approved | Mississippi Public School Support Amendments, Initiative 42 and Alternative 42 | Yes signified that the voter approved of Initiative 42 - which would have required the state government to establish, maintain and support "an adequate and efficient system of free public schools," enforced by the state's judicial system - over Alternative 65A, would have required the state legislature to establish, maintain and support "an effective system of free public schools" at the legislature's own discretion. (Note: In order for either Initiative 42 or Alternative 42 to pass, Mississippi Public Schools Amendment must first receive majority support for 'either measure' over 'neither measure') | Nov 3 | 323,805; 59.04% (Note: Despite Initiative 42 receiving majority support over Alternative 42, as the preceding ballot measure failed to see 'either measure' reach majority support, neither plan was implemented.) | 224,634; 40.96% |

=== Ohio ===
| Origin | Status | Measure | Description (Result of a "yes" vote) | Date | Yes | No |
|---|---|---|---|---|---|---|
| Legislature | Approved | Ohio Issue 1, Redistricting Commission Amendment | Create the seven-member Ohio Redistricting Commission, responsible for adopting state legislative districts, and establishing requirements regarding minority party support. | Nov 3 | 2,126,822; 71.47% | 849,043; 28.53% |
| Legislature | Approved | Ohio Issue 2, Ballot Initiatives to Create Monopolies Amendment | Prevent Issue 3 from taking effect—had it been approved—and allowed the Ohio Ballot Board to regulate future ballot measures dealing with monopolies. | Nov 3 | 1,621,329; 51.33% | 1537261; 48.67% |
| Citizens | Failed | Ohio Issue 3, Marijuana Legalization Initiative | Legalize the limited sale and use of marijuana and creating 10 facilities with exclusive commercial rights to grow marijuana. | May 5 | 1,166,692; 36.35% | 2,042,902; 63.65% |

=== Texas ===
| Origin | Status | Measure | Description (Result of a "yes" vote) | Date | Yes | No |
|---|---|---|---|---|---|---|
| Legislature | Approved | Texas Homestead Exemption for School District Property Taxes Amendment, Proposition 1 | Increase the homestead exemption from $15,000 to $25,000. | Nov 3 | 1,369,813; 86.38% | 216,032; 13.62% |
| Legislature | Approved | Texas Property Tax Exemption for Surviving Spouses of Disabled Veterans Amendment, Proposition 2 | Extend the applicability of the homestead exemption law beyond January 1, 2010, the date the law originally took effect. | Nov 3 | 1,433,837; 91.40% | 134,885; 8.60% |
| Legislature | Approved | Texas State Capital Residency Repeal Amendment, Proposition 3 | Repeal the constitutional requirement that statewide-elected executive officials live in the state capital. | Nov 3 | 1,022,525; 66.09% | 524,625; 33.91% |
| Legislature | Approved | Texas Sports Team Charitable Foundation Raffles Amendment, Proposition 4 | Authorize professional sports team charitable foundations in existence on January 1, 2016, to operate charitable raffles. | Nov 3 | 1,074,485; 69.41% | 473,460; 30.59% |
| Legislature | Approved | Texas Population Requirement for Private Road Work Amendment, Proposition 5 | Increase the population size for counties allowed to perform private road construction and maintenance from 5,000 to 7,500. | Nov 3 | 1,278,829; 82.74% | 266,782; 17.26% |
| Legislature | Approved | Texas Right to Hunt, Fish and Harvest Amendment, Proposition 6 | Add text to the state constitution preserving the right to hunt and fish, and recognized such activities as the preferred methods for wildlife management. | Nov 3 | 1,260,763; 81.04% | 294,973; 18.96% |
| Legislature | Approved | Texas Sales and Use Tax Revenue for Transportation Amendment, Proposition 7 | Supply funding to the State Highway Fund from two tax revenue sources: the sales and use tax and state motor vehicle sales and rental tax. | Nov 3 | 1,295,248; 83.24% | 260,810; 16.76% |

=== Washington ===
| Origin | Status | Measure | Description (Result of a "yes" vote) | Date | Yes | No |
|---|---|---|---|---|---|---|
| Citizens | Approved | Washington Initiative 1366, Sales Tax Decrease or Two-Thirds Vote for Tax Increase Measure | Lower state sales taxes from 6.5 to 5.5 percent if the Legislature declines to change how tax increases are approved. | Nov 3 | 760,518; 51.52% | 715,684; 48.48% |
| Citizens | Approved | Washington Animal Trafficking, Initiative 1401 | Amend penalties for trafficking certain endangered species or their products. | Nov 3 | 1,043,773; 70.29% | 441,170; 29.71% |
| Advisory Question | Approved | Washington Oil Spill Prevention Taxes Advisory Vote No. 10 | Advise the Legislature to leave current laws unchanged; in particular, retaining both the oil response and oil spill administration taxes. | Nov 3 | 737,273; 51.32% | 699,275; 48.68% |
| Advisory Question | Approved | Washington Medical Marijuana Patient Database Fee Advisory Vote No. 11 | Advise the Legislature to leave current laws relating to the one dollar fee for marijuana recognition cards as they are. | Nov 3 | 852,735; 58.73% | 599,324; 41.27% |
| Advisory Question | Failed | Washington Gas Tax Increase Advisory Vote No. 12 | Advise the Legislature to maintain the 11.9 cent gas tax increase. | May 5 | 513,742; 35.63% | 928,324; 64.37% |
| Advisory Question | Failed | Washington Elimination of Tax Preferences for Manufacturing Advisory Vote No. 13 | Advise the Legislature to leave current laws unchanged and retain current manufacturer tax preferences. | May 5 | 521,096; 36.59% | 903,222; 63.41% |

=== Wisconsin ===
| Origin | Status | Measure | Description (Result of a "yes" vote) | Date | Yes | No |
|---|---|---|---|---|---|---|
| Legislature | Approved | Wisconsin Question 1, Supreme Court Chief Justice Amendment | Provide for an election of the Wisconsin Supreme Court Chief Justice by a majority of the justices serving on the court to serve for a two-year term. | Apr 7 | 433,533; 53.00% | 384,503; 47.00% |
