= Sales taxes in the United States =

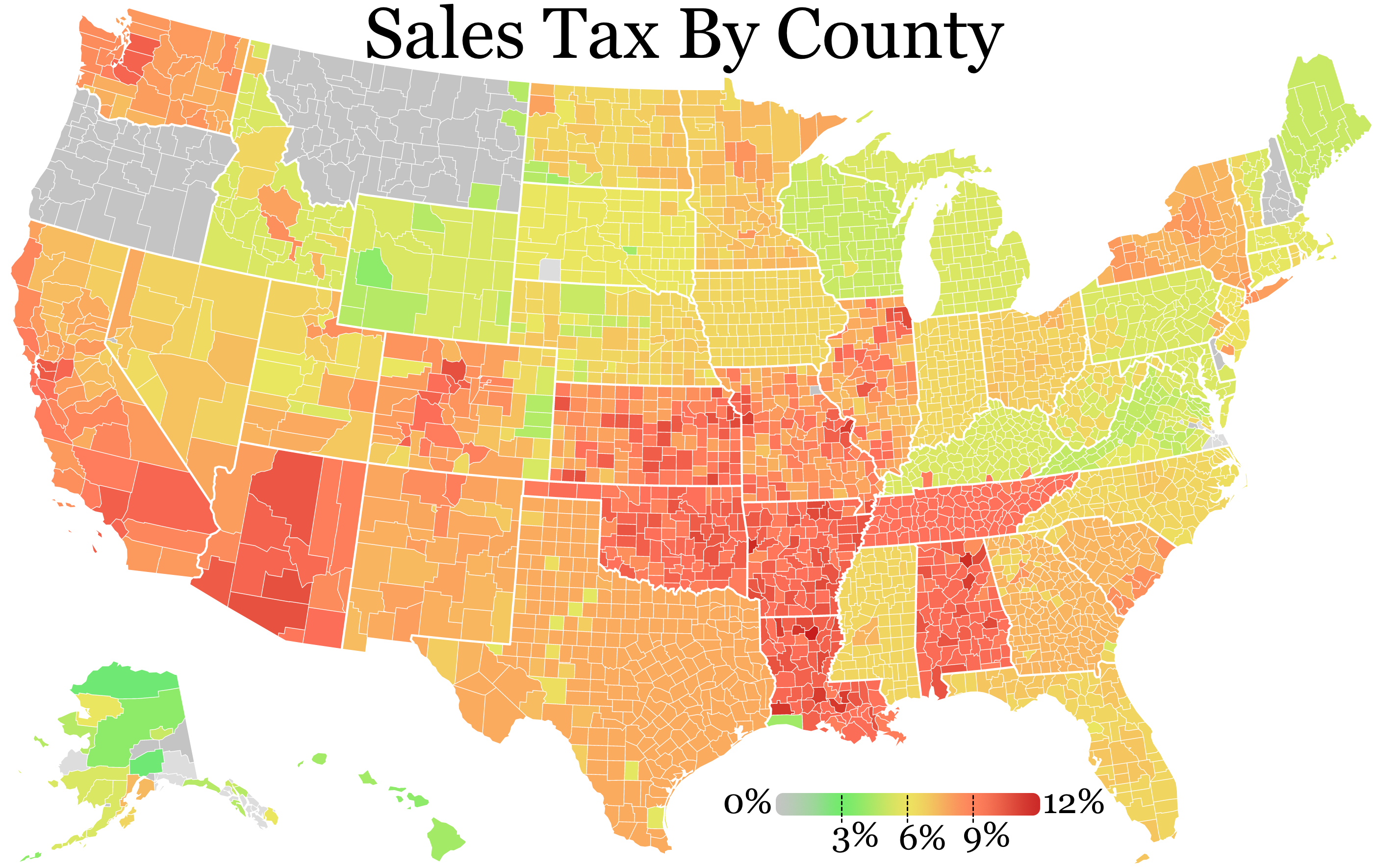
0% 3% 6% 9% 12%

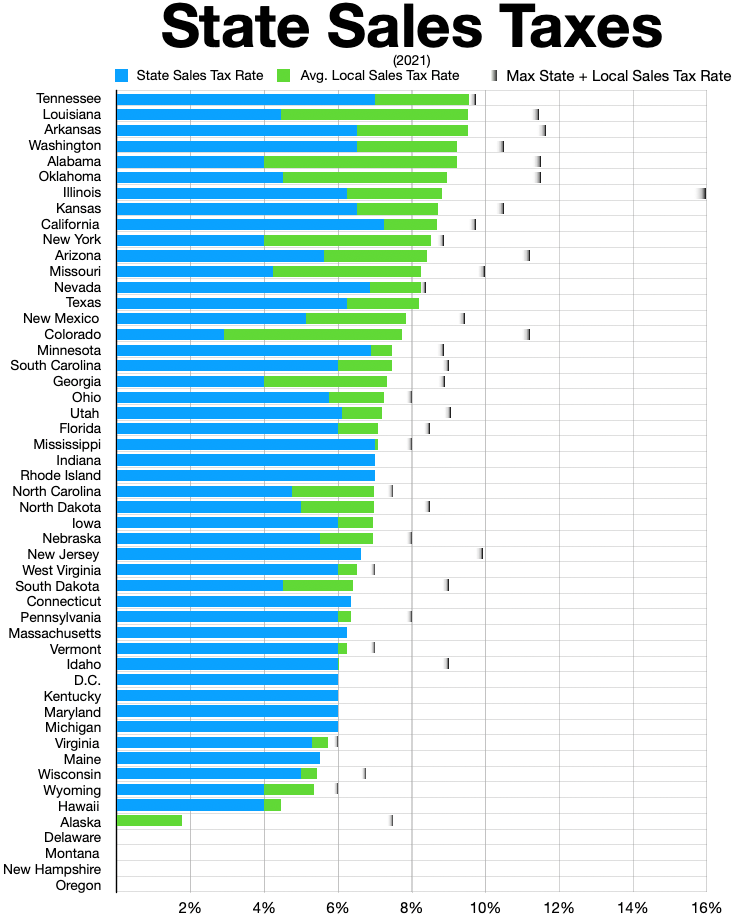
State & Local Sales Taxes (2021)

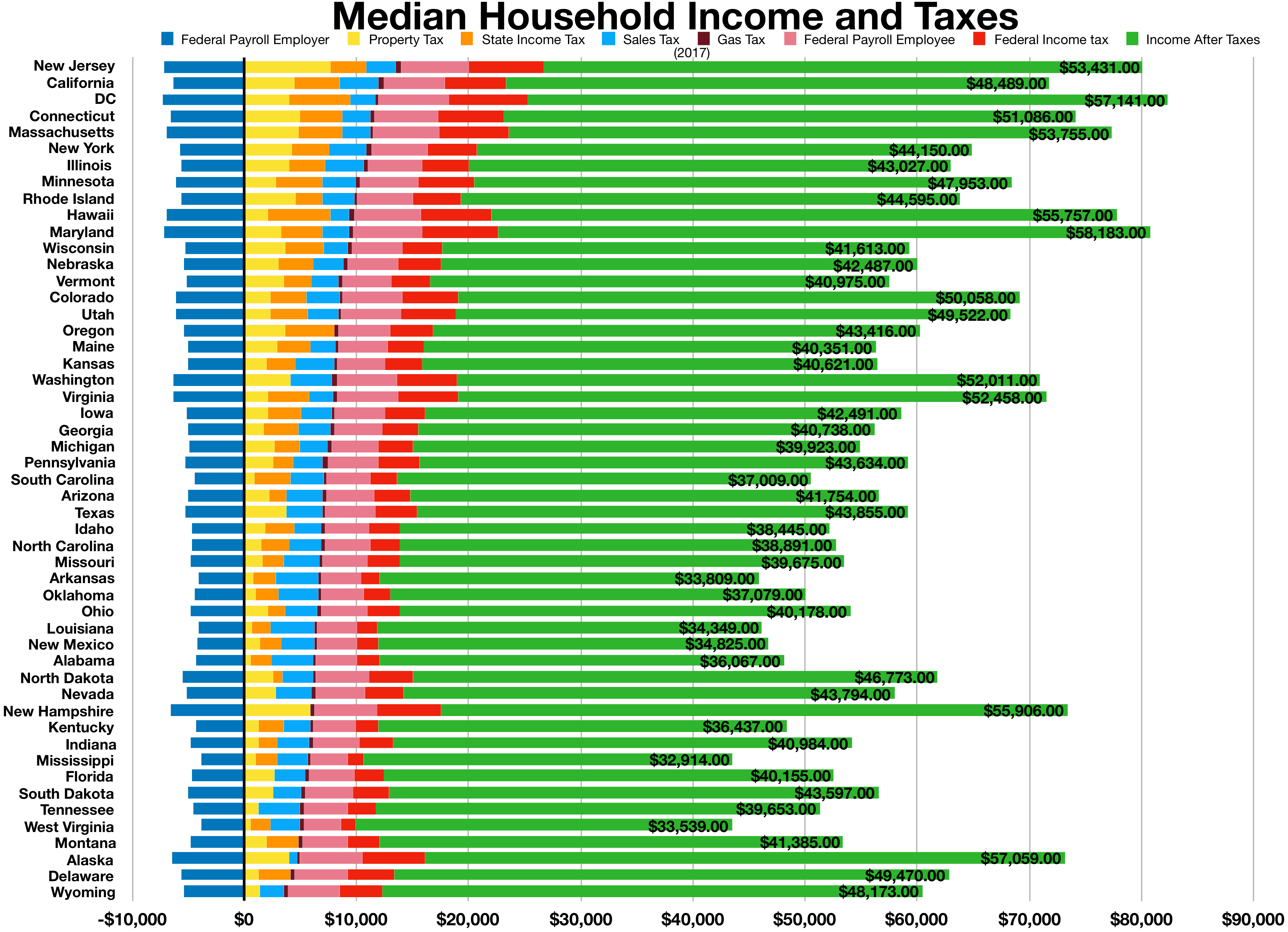
Median household income and taxes

State & local sales taxes average

Sales taxes in the United States are taxes placed on the sale or lease of goods and services in the United States. Sales tax is governed at the state level, and no national general sales tax exists. Forty-five states, the District of Columbia, the territories of Puerto Rico, and Guam impose general sales taxes that apply to the sale or lease of most goods and some services. States also may levy selective sales taxes on the sale or lease of particular goods or services. States may grant local governments the authority to impose additional general or selective sales taxes.

As of 2025, five states have no statewide sales tax: Alaska, Delaware, Montana, New Hampshire, and Oregon. Louisiana ranks as the state with the highest sales tax. Residents in some areas face a 12% sales tax.

Laws vary widely regarding which goods are subject to tax. For instance, some U.S. states such as Tennessee, Idaho, or Mississippi tax groceries, feminine hygiene products and diapers. Others, such as Minnesota and Massachusetts, do not tax these items.

Sales tax is calculated by multiplying the purchase price by the applicable tax rate. The seller collects it at the time of the sale. Use tax is self-assessed by a buyer who has not paid sales tax on a taxable purchase. Unlike the value added tax, a sales tax is imposed only at the retail level. In cases where items are sold at retail more than once, such as used cars, the sales tax can be charged on the same item indefinitely.

Sales taxes, including those imposed by local governments, are generally administered at the state level. States imposing sales tax either impose the tax on retail sellers, such as with Transaction Privilege Tax in Arizona, or impose it on retail buyers and require sellers to collect it.

In either case, the seller files returns and remits the tax to the state. In states where the tax is on the seller, it is customary for the seller to demand reimbursement from the buyer. Procedural rules vary widely. Sellers generally must collect tax from in-state purchasers unless the purchaser provides an exemption certificate. Most states allow or require electronic remittance.

== Taxable items ==
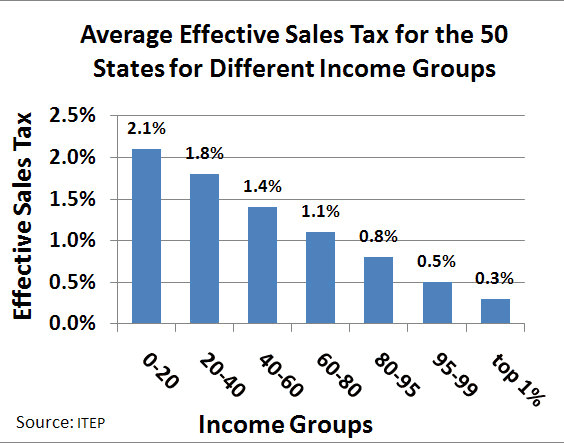
The average effective sales tax for different income groups of the combined 50 States (2007). The effective tax shown is calculated using a microsimulation model based on the 1990 Public Use Microdata Sample of census records and statistical data from the Internal Revenue Service for undisclosed years.

Sales taxes are imposed only on taxable transfers of goods or services. The tax is computed as the tax rate times the taxable transaction value. Rates vary by state and by locality within a state. Not all types of transfers are taxable. The tax may be imposed on sales to consumers and to businesses.

=== Taxable sales ===
Transfers of tangible personal property for cash or a promise to pay cash (sales) are often subject to sales tax, subject to exceptions. Sales tax does not apply to transfers of real property, though some states impose a real estate transfer or documentary tax on such transfers. All states provide some exemptions from sales tax for wholesale sales, that is, sales for resale. However, some states tax sales for resale through vending machines.

Purchases of gift cards are not subject to sales tax in all states. These purchases are considered to be similar to the exchange of cash. The sales tax will be charged when gift cards are used as payment for taxable goods or services. There was a proposal in New York State to impose a sales tax when a gift card is purchased instead of imposing it when the card is used, but it failed.

Most states also exempt bulk sales, such as sales of an entire business. Most states exempt goods purchased for use as ingredients or parts in further manufacturing from sales tax. Buyers in exempt sales must follow certain procedures or face tax.

Sales to businesses and to consumers are generally taxed the same, except as noted in the preceding paragraph. Businesses receive no offset to sales tax collection and payment obligations for their own purchases. This differs significantly from value-added taxes.

The place and manner of sale may affect whether a sale of particular goods is taxable. Many states tax food for consumption on premises but not food sold for off-premises consumption. The use to which goods are put may also affect whether the sale is subject to tax. Goods used as ingredients in manufacturing may be exempt from tax, whereas the same goods used as supplies may not be.

==== Rentals ====
Many states tax the rental of tangible personal property. Often, the tax is not dependent on the use to which the property will be put. The State of Florida and its counties charge a use tax on the rental of commercial real estate. Cities and counties in Arizona may charge their own use tax on commercial leases, but not all do.

==== Exempt organizations ====
Many states exempt charitable, religious, and certain other organizations from sales or use taxes on goods purchased for the organization's use. Generally, such an exemption does not apply to a trade or business conducted by the organization.

=== Use tax ===
States that impose sales taxes also impose a similar tax on buyers of taxable property or services when sales tax is not paid. Use taxes are functionally equivalent to sales taxes. The sales and use taxes, taken together, "provide a uniform tax upon either the sale or the use of all tangible personal property irrespective of where it may be purchased." Some states permit offset of sales taxes paid in other states on the purchased goods against use tax in the taxpayer's state.

=== Taxable value ===
The amount subject to sales tax is generally the net sales price. Such price is generally after any applicable discounts; however, in some states, the rules vary depending on whether a discount coupon is provided by a seller or by a manufacturer.

Some states exempt a portion of the sales or purchase price from tax for some classes of goods.

=== Taxable goods ===
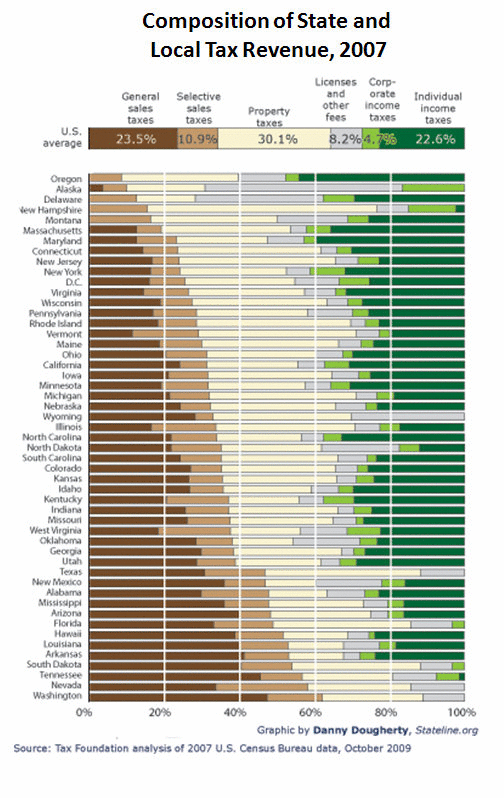
The composition of state and local tax revenues by sales taxes (brown), property taxes (white), licenses and other fees (grey), individual and corporate income taxes (green) in 2007.

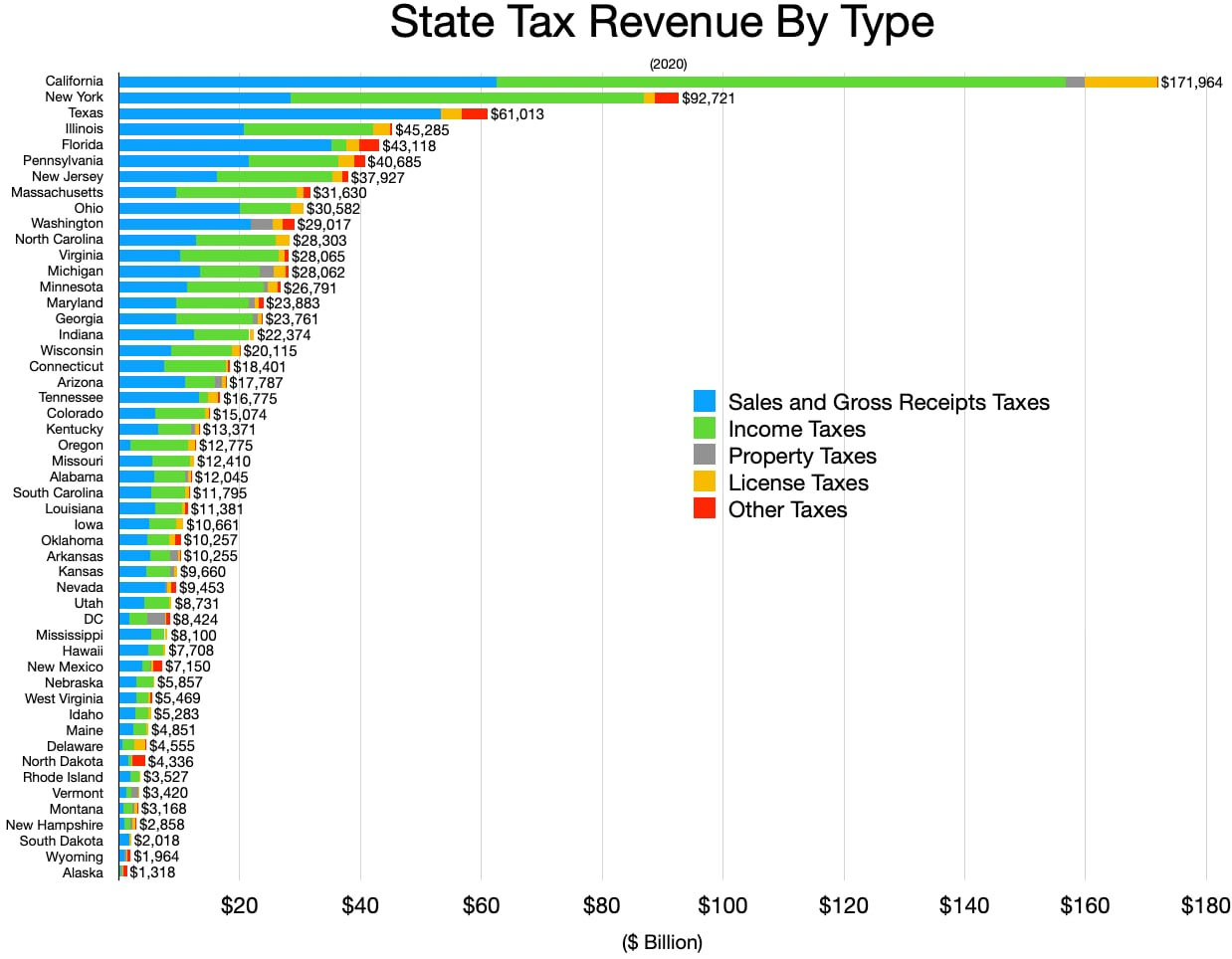
Total State Government Tax Revenue By Type in 2020

No state imposes sales tax on all types of goods. State laws vary widely regarding which goods are subject to tax. Food for preparation and consumption in the home is often not taxable, nor are prescription medications. By contrast, restaurant meals are often taxed.

Many states provide exemptions for certain types of goods but not for others. Certain types of foods may be exempt, and certain types taxable, even when sold in a grocery store for home consumption. Lists of what goods are taxable and what are not may be voluminous. All items purchased using the Supplemental Nutrition Assistance Program are exempt from sales tax due to federal law.

=== Services ===
Most states tax some services, while others tax many. However, taxation of services is the exception rather than the rule. Few states tax the services of a doctor, dentist, or attorney. Services performed in connection with the sale of tangible personal property are often subject to tax. Most states, however, tax services that are integral to producing goods, such as printing or cabinetmaking.

Telecommunications services are subject to a tax similar to a sales tax in most states. Only a few states tax internet access or other information services. States rarely tax construction services. Materials used in the construction of real property may be subject to sales tax to the builder, the subcontractor, or the person engaging the builder, or may be wholly exempt from sales tax.

=== Intangible property ===
Most sales tax laws do not apply to most payments for intangible property. Some states tax certain forms of intangible property transfers or licenses. A common transaction subject to sales tax is the license of "shrink wrap" software. State courts have often found that numerous transfers of intangible rights are to be considered subject to sales tax where not specifically exempted.

=== Sales for resale ===
All states exempt from sales or use tax purchases of goods made for resale in the same form. In many states, resale includes rental of the purchased property. If the purchased property is not identical to the property being resold, the purchase may be taxable. Further, use of the property before sale may defeat the resale exemption. Goods purchased for free distribution may be taxed on purchase in some states, and not in others.

Goods purchased to be used as ingredients in manufacturing tangible personal property are generally not taxable. Purchases of food by a restaurant are generally not taxable in states that tax restaurant sales, even though the ingredients are transformed. Steel purchased for use in machines is generally not taxable. However, supplies consumed by the same businesses may be taxable. Criteria vary widely by state.

Purchase of goods to be provided as part of the performance of services may be taxed. Airlines and hotels may be taxed on purchases of food to be provided as part of their services, such as in-flight meals or free breakfast. Where there is a separate charge for such goods, they may be considered purchased for resale.

=== Distinguishing goods from nontaxable items ===
Since services and intangibles are typically not subject to tax, the distinction between a taxable sale of tangible property and a nontaxable sale of services or an intangible transfer is a major source of controversy. Many state tax administrators and courts look to the "true object" or "dominant purpose" of the transaction to determine if it is a taxable sale. Some courts have looked at the significance of the property in relation to the services provided. Where property is sold with an agreement to provide service (such as an extended warranty or service contract), the service agreement is generally treated as a separate sale if it can be purchased separately. Michigan and Colorado courts have adopted a more holistic approach, considering various factors in a particular transaction.

== Collection, payment, and tax returns ==
Vendors collect sales taxes in most states. Use taxes are self-assessed by purchasers. Many states require individuals and businesses that regularly make sales to register with the state. All states that impose a sales tax require that taxes collected be remitted to the state at least annually. Most states have thresholds at which more frequent payments are required. Some states provide a discount to vendors upon payment of collected tax.

Sales taxes collected in some states are considered the state's money, and a vendor failing to remit the tax is in breach of its fiduciary duties. Sellers of taxable property must file tax returns with each jurisdiction in which they are required to collect sales tax. Most jurisdictions require that returns be filed monthly, though sellers with small amounts of tax due may be allowed to file less frequently.

Sales tax returns typically report all sales, taxable sales, sales by category of exemption, and the amount of tax due. When multiple tax rates are imposed (e.g., on different classes of property sold), these amounts are typically reported separately for each rate. Some states combine state and local sales tax returns, but many local jurisdictions require separate reporting. Some jurisdictions permit or require electronic filing of returns.

Purchasers of goods who have not paid sales tax in their own jurisdiction must file use tax returns to report taxable purchases. Many states permit such filing for individuals as part of individual income tax returns.

=== Exemption certificates ===
Purchasers are required to pay sales tax unless they present the seller with certification that the purchase is exempt from tax (exemption certificate). The certificate must be on a form approved by the state. 38 states have approved use of the Multistate Tax Commission's Uniform Sales and Use Tax Certificate.

Exemptions typically fall into two categories: usage-based or entity-based. Use-based exemptions are when an otherwise taxable item or service is used in a manner that has been deemed exempt. The resale exemption is the most common use-based exemption. Other use-based exemptions could include items or services used in manufacturing, research & development, or teleproduction. Entity-based exemptions are when the item or service is exempt solely because the purchaser falls into a category that the state has granted an exempt status. Exempt entities could be government (federal, state, or local), non-profit organizations, religious organizations, tribal governments, or foreign diplomats. Every state decides for itself which use-based and entity-based exemption it will grant.

=== Penalties ===
Persons required to file sales or use tax returns who do not file are subject to penalties. Persons who fail to properly pay sales and use tax when due are also subject to penalties. The penalties tend to be based on the amount of unpaid tax and vary by jurisdiction.

=== Tax audits ===
All states that impose sales taxes examine the sales and use tax returns of many taxpayers each year. Upon such audit, the state may propose an adjustment of the amount of tax due. Taxpayers have certain rights of appeal, which vary by jurisdiction. Some states require payment of tax before a judicial appeal, and some consider payment of tax an admission of tax liability.

== History ==
Prior to the coming of World War I in the summer of 1914, only two countries, Mexico and the Philippines, made use of a general sales tax for national finance. Excise tax — a transaction tax on the sale of specific items — was broadly used, however, and the idea of a general sales tax was neither unknown nor obscure to political decision-makers in the United States.

Indeed, in 1921 there was a concerted effort to implement a 1% national sales tax in the United States by attaching it to the 1921 national revenue bill and 1922 legislation providing for a soldiers' bonus. Although the proposals for a national sales tax were defeated by an alliance of farmer and labor interests, the state of West Virginia implemented a 1% sales tax of its own in that same year, using the revenue so generated as a replacement for a corporate income tax. Improving economic conditions throughout that decade of the 1920s would leave West Virginia's use of a sales tax unique among the 48 American states.

In October 1929, the global economic crisis struck the United States. As unemployment skyrocketed, income tax revenue plummeted and defaults on property taxes spiked. Meanwhile, calls for state spending on relief measures for the indigent and the unemployed expanded beyond the states' capabilities. Georgia's early adoption of a sales tax in 1929 was followed by a wave of sales tax adoptions, spurred on by the deep financial crisis. In 1933, 11 more states, including New York, Illinois, California, and Michigan, adopted sales taxes.

== Constitutional limitations ==
Under two now-overturned Supreme Court decisions, Quill Corp. v. North Dakota (1992) and National Bellas Hess v. Illinois (1967), states were not allowed to charge sales tax on sellers who did not have a physical presence or "nexus" in the state, such as companies doing mail order, online shopping, and home shopping by phone. Some states do attempt to charge consumers an identical per-transaction use tax, but compliance is relatively low due to enforcement difficulties. The June 2018 decision South Dakota v. Wayfair reversed this interpretation of the Commerce Clause, allowing states to collect sales tax from out-of-state merchants when the consumer is in the state.

Several state constitutions impose limitations on sales tax. These limitations restrict or prohibit the taxing of certain items, such as food.

== By jurisdiction ==
Sales tax rates and what is taxed vary by jurisdiction. The following table compares taxes on selected classes of goods in the states. Significant other differences apply. Following the table is abbreviated coverage of selected sales tax rates by state.

=== Summary table ===
Color	Explanation
Exempt	Exempt from general sales tax
Exempt < $50	Purchases under $50 exempt, higher taxed
Taxed	Subject to general sales tax
7% (higher)	Taxed at a higher rate than the general rate
3% (lower)	Taxed at a lower rate than the general rate
3%+	Some locations tax more
Up to 3%	Some locations tax less
N/A	No statewide general sales tax

Jurisdiction	Base sales tax	Total with max local surtax	Groceries	Prepared food	Prescription drug	Non-prescription drug	Clothing	Intangibles	Feminine Hygiene
§ Alabama	4%	13.5%	2%+ (lower)	Taxed	Exempt	Taxed	Taxed	Taxed	Taxed
§ Alaska	0%	7%	N/A	N/A	N/A	N/A	N/A	N/A	N/A
§ Arizona	5.6%	10.725%	Exempt	Taxed	Exempt	Taxed	Taxed	Taxed	Taxed
§ Arkansas	6.5%	11.625%	Exempt	Taxed	Exempt	Taxed	Taxed	Exempt	Taxed
§ California	7.25%	11.25%	Exempt	Taxed	Exempt	Taxed	Taxed	Exempt	Exempt
§ Colorado	2.9%	10%	Exempt	Taxed	Exempt	Taxed	Taxed	Taxed	Exempt
§ Connecticut	6.35%		Exempt	7.35% (higher)	Exempt	Exempt	Taxed	1% (lower)	Exempt
§ Delaware	0%		N/A	N/A	N/A	N/A	N/A	N/A	N/A
§ District of Columbia	6%		Exempt	10% (higher)	Exempt	Exempt	Taxed	Taxed	Exempt
§ Florida	6%	7.5%	Exempt	Up to 9% (higher)	Exempt	Taxed	Taxed	Exempt	Exempt
§ Georgia	4%	8%	Up to 4% (lower)	Taxed	Exempt	Taxed	Taxed	Exempt	Taxed
§ Guam	4%	4%	Taxed	Taxed	Taxed	Taxed	Taxed		Taxed
§ Hawaii	4.166%	4.712%	Taxed	Taxed	Taxed	Taxed	Taxed	Taxed	Taxed
§ Idaho	6%	8.5%	Taxed	Taxed	Exempt	Taxed	Taxed	Taxed	Taxed
§ Illinois	6.25%	10.25%	0-1% (local only)	8.25%+ (higher)	1%+ (lower)	1%+ (lower)	Taxed	Exempt	Exempt
§ Indiana	7%		Exempt	Up to 9% (higher)	Exempt	Taxed	Taxed	Taxed	Taxed
§ Iowa	6%	7%	Exempt	Taxed	Exempt	Taxed	Taxed	Exempt	Exempt
§ Kansas	6.5%	12%	0-5.5% (local only)	Taxed	Exempt	Taxed	Taxed	Exempt	Taxed
§ Kentucky	6%		Exempt	Taxed	Exempt	Taxed	Taxed	Taxed	Taxed
§ Louisiana	5%	13.5%	Exempt	Taxed	Taxed	Taxed	Taxed	Taxed	Exempt
§ Maine	5.5%		Exempt	8% (higher)	Exempt	Taxed	Taxed	Taxed	Exempt
§ Maryland	6%		Exempt	Taxed	Exempt	Taxed	Taxed	Taxed	Exempt
§ Massachusetts	6.25%		Exempt	Up to 7% (higher)	Exempt	Taxed	Exempt < $175	Exempt	Exempt
§ Michigan	6%		Exempt	Taxed	Exempt	Taxed	Taxed	Exempt	Exempt
§ Minnesota	6.875%	7.875%	Exempt	Up to 10.775% (higher)	Exempt	Taxed	Exempt	Taxed	Exempt
§ Mississippi	7%	7.25%	5-5.25% (lower)	Taxed	Taxed	Taxed	Taxed	Taxed	Taxed
§ Missouri	4.225%	10.85%	1.225% (lower)	Taxed	Taxed	Taxed	Taxed	Exempt	Taxed
§ Montana	0%		N/A	N/A	N/A	N/A	N/A	N/A	N/A
§ Nebraska	5.5%	7.5%	Exempt	9.5% (Omaha, higher)	Taxed	Taxed	Taxed	Taxed	Exempt
§ Nevada	6.85%	8.375%	Exempt	Taxed	Exempt	Taxed	Taxed	Exempt	Exempt
§ New Hampshire	0%		N/A	8.5% (higher)	N/A	N/A	N/A	N/A	N/A
§ New Jersey	6.625%	12.625%	Exempt	Taxed	Exempt	Exempt	Exempt	Taxed	Exempt
§ New Mexico	5.125%	8.688%	Exempt	Taxed	Taxed	Taxed	Taxed	Taxed	Exempt
§ New York	4%	8.875%	Exempt	Taxed	Exempt	Exempt	Exempt < $110	Exempt	Exempt
§ North Carolina	4.75%	8.25%	2% (lower)	Up to 8.50% (higher)	Exempt	Taxed	Taxed	Taxed	Taxed
§ North Dakota	5%	8%	Exempt	Taxed	Taxed	Taxed	Taxed	Exempt	Taxed
§ Ohio	5.75%	8%	Exempt	Dine-in taxed	Exempt	Taxed	Taxed	Taxed	Exempt
§ Oklahoma	4.5%	11%	0-6% (local only)	Taxed	Taxed	Taxed	Taxed	Exempt	Taxed
§ Oregon	0%		N/A	N/A	N/A	N/A	N/A	N/A	N/A
§ Pennsylvania	6%	8%	Exempt	Taxed	Exempt	Exempt	Exempt	Taxed	Exempt
§ Puerto Rico	10.5%	11.5%	1% (lower)	Taxed	Exempt	Taxed	Taxed		Taxed
§ Rhode Island	7%		Exempt	8% (higher)	Exempt	Taxed	Exempt < $250	Exempt	Exempt
§ South Carolina	6%	9%	Exempt	10.5% (higher)	Exempt	Taxed	Taxed	Exempt	Exempt
§ South Dakota	4.2%	6.2%	Taxed	Taxed	Taxed	Taxed	Taxed	Taxed	Taxed
§ Tennessee	7%	9.75%	4%+ (lower)	Taxed	Taxed	Taxed	Taxed	Taxed	Taxed
§ Texas	6.25%	8.25%	Exempt	Taxed	Exempt	Exempt	Taxed	Taxed	Exempt
§ Utah	6.1%	8.35%	3% (lower)	Taxed	Exempt	Taxed	Taxed	Taxed	Taxed
§ Vermont	6%	7%	Exempt	9%+ (higher)	Exempt	Exempt	Exempt	Taxed	Exempt
§ Virginia	5.3%	7%	1.0% (lower)	5.3%+ (higher)	Exempt	Exempt	Taxed	Exempt	Exempt
§ Washington	6.5%	10.6%	Exempt	Up to 10% (higher)	Exempt	Taxed	Taxed	Taxed	Exempt
§ West Virginia	6%	7%	Exempt	Taxed	Exempt	Taxed	Taxed	Exempt	Taxed
§ Wisconsin	5%	7.9%	Exempt	Taxed	Exempt	Taxed	Taxed	Taxed	Taxed
§ Wyoming	4%	6%	Exempt	Taxed	Exempt	Taxed	Taxed	Taxed	Taxed

Notes:

- These states tax food but give an income tax credit to compensate poor households: Hawaii, Idaho, Oklahoma, and South Dakota.
- Uniform local taxes are included in the base rates for California and Utah (1.25%), and Virginia (1%).

=== Alabama ===
Alabama has a state general sales tax of 4%, plus any additional local city and county taxes. As of August 2015, the highest total general sales tax rate in Alabama is in the portions of Arab that are in Cullman County, which total to 13.5%. Alabama still taxes groceries, which disproportionately affects minorities and low-income families with children, albeit at a rate of 3%, lower than the general sales tax rate.

City Tax Rates

- Montgomery has a total sales tax of 10%, as do Birmingham and Mobile.
- Huntsville has a total sales tax of 9% in most of the city, which is in Madison County. The smaller portion of Huntsville in Limestone County has a 10.5% sales tax due to the 2% higher Limestone County sales tax. This only affects a few retail businesses on the I-565 service road.
- Decatur has a 9% total sales tax in most of its city limits, but has a 10% total sales tax in the small portion of the city that is in Limestone County, due to the higher county tax.
- The highest sales tax in Alabama is Flomaton, with a sales tax of 11%.

=== Alaska ===
There is no state sales tax in Alaska; however, local governments – which include boroughs, the Alaska equivalent of counties, and municipalities – may levy up to 7.5 percent. As of January 2009, 108 of them do so. Municipal sales taxes are collected in addition to borough sales taxes, if any. Regulations and exemptions vary widely across the state. The two largest cities, Anchorage and Fairbanks, do not charge a local sales tax. The state capital, Juneau, has a 5 percent sales tax rate.

=== Arizona ===
Arizona has a transaction privilege tax (TPT) that differs from a true sales tax in that it is a gross receipts tax, levied on the vendor's gross receipts rather than the consumer's liability. Vendors are permitted to pass the amount of the tax on to the consumer, but remain the liable parties for the tax to the state. TPT is imposed under 16 tax classifications, but most retail transactions are taxed at 6.6%.

Cities and counties can add up to 6 percent to the total rate. Food for home consumption, prescription drugs (including prescription drugs and certain prescribed homeopathic remedies), and many other items of tangible personal property are exempt from the state retail TPT; cities can charge tax on food, and many do. Arizona's TPT is one of the few excise taxes in the country imposed on contracting activities rather than sales of construction materials. Phoenix, the capital and largest city, has a 2% TPT rate.

A use tax applies to purchases made from out-of-state online retailers and catalogs. A law passed in July 2011 requires Arizona residents to declare how much use tax they owe.

Indian reservations in Arizona have their own sales taxes, and these are some of the highest sales tax rates in the United States. The highest sales tax in the country as of 2012, 13.725%, was found in Tuba City.

=== Arkansas ===
Arkansas has a state sales tax of 6.50%. City taxes range from an additional 0.25% to 3.5%, and county taxes could be as much as 3.25%. Including city and county taxes, the highest sales tax rate is 11.625% in the portions of Mansfield that are in Scott County.

Since January 1, 2019, Arkansas' state sales tax on unprepared food (groceries) has been reduced from 1.5% to 0.125% (one cent per $8). Sales taxes on groceries had previously been reduced to 1.5% from 2% on July 1, 2011, to 2% from 3% on July 1, 2009, and to 3% from 6% on July 1, 2007. Local sales taxes on groceries remained unchanged.

=== California ===
California, from 1991 to 2012 and since 2017, has a base sales tax of 7.25%, composed of a 6% state tax and a 1.25% uniform local tax. California is ranked as having the tenth highest average combined state and local sales tax rate in the United States at 8.25%. As of July 2019, the city's rates vary, from 7.25% to 10.5% (Santa Fe Springs). Sales and use taxes are collected by the California Department of Tax and Fee Administration (before July 2017, those taxes were collected by the California State Board of Equalization). Income and franchise taxes are collected separately by the California Franchise Tax Board.

In general, sales tax is required on all purchases of tangible personal property to its ultimate consumer. Medical devices such as prosthetics and dental implant fixtures are exempt from sales tax, except for prosthetic teeth (e.g., dentures), dental orthotics/orthopedic devices, and dental crowns, which the state treats as personal property. Grocery goods, bakery items, hot beverages, candies, livestock, crops and seeds, fertilizer used to grow food, certain devices related to alternative energy, and one-time sales are also exempt from sales tax.

=== Colorado ===
Colorado's state sales tax is 2.9%, with some cities and counties levying additional taxes. Denver's tangibles tax is 3.62%, with food eaten away from the home being taxed at 4%, most unprepared food (groceries) are exempt. A football stadium tax, which expired December 31, 2011, but still has a mass transit tax, and a scientific and cultural facilities tax. The total sales tax varies by city and county. Total sales tax on an item purchased in Falcon, Colorado, would be 5.13% (2.9% state, 1.23% county, and 1% PPRTA). The sales tax rate in Larimer County is roughly 7.5%. Most transactions in Denver and the surrounding area are taxed at about 8%. The sales tax rate for non-food items in Denver is 7.62%. Food and beverage items total 8.00%, and rental cars total 11.25%.

=== Connecticut ===
Connecticut has a 6.35% sales tax, raised from 6% effective July 1, 2011, 6.25% to the state and 0.1% to the city/town. Most non-prepared food products are exempt, as are prescription medications, all internet services, all magazine and newspaper subscriptions, and textbooks (for college students only). Also compact fluorescent light bulbs are tax exempt per Connecticut state law.

Shipping and delivery charges, including US postage, made by a retailer to a customer are subject to sales and use taxes when provided in connection with the sale of taxable tangible personal property or services. The tax applies even if the charges are separately stated, and regardless of whether the seller or a third party provides shipping or delivery. No tax is due on shipping and delivery charges in connection with any sale that is not subject to sales or use tax. Shipping or delivery charges related to sales for resale or sales of exempt items are not taxable. Likewise, charges for mailing or delivery services are not subject to tax if they are made in connection with the sale of nontaxable services.

=== Delaware ===
Delaware does not assess a sales tax on consumers. The state does, however, impose a tax on the gross receipts of most businesses and a 5.25% document fee on vehicle registrations. Business and occupational license tax rates range from 0.0945% to 1.9914%, depending upon the category of business activity.

=== District of Columbia ===
Washington, D.C. has a sales tax rate of 6% as of October 1, 2018. The tax is imposed on sale of tangible personal property and selected services. (Non-prepared food, including bottled water and pet food, is not subject to the sales tax; however, soda and sports drinks are subject to the sales tax.) A 10% tax is imposed on liquor sold for off-premises consumption, 10% on restaurant meals (including carry-out) and rental cars, 18% on parking, and 14.5% on hotel accommodations. Portions of the hotel and restaurant meals tax rate are allocated to the Convention Center Fund. Groceries, prescription and non-prescription drugs, and residential utilities services are exempt from the district's sales tax.

The district once had two sales tax holidays each year, one during "back-to-school" and one immediately preceding Christmas. The "back to school" tax holiday was repealed on May 12, 2009.

On January 1, 2010, the district began levying a 5-cent-per-bag tax on each plastic or paper bag provided by a retailer at the point of sale, if that retailer sells food or alcohol. The retailer retains one cent of the tax, or two cents if it offers customers a refund for bringing their own bags. The remaining three or four cents go to the district's Anacostia River cleanup fund.

=== Florida ===
Florida has a general sales tax rate of 6%. Miami-Dade County, like most Florida counties, has an additional county sales surtax of 1%. The tax is imposed on the sale or rental of goods, the sale of admissions, the lease, license, or rental of real property, the lease or rental of transient living accommodations, and the sale of a limited number of services such as commercial pest control, commercial cleaning, and certain protection services. There are a variety of exemptions from the tax, including groceries and prescriptions.

The aforementioned services are not the only ones potentially subject to sales tax. Florida has a taxation rule colloquially known as the "one drop of oil" rule. According to Florida tax attorney Jeanette Moffa,

The “one drop of oil” rule uses the example of an oil change. If you bring your car to a mechanic and he examines your car, checks the engine, and checks the oil levels, he’s performed a pure labor service, and no sales tax would be due. However, the second he adds ANY tangible personal property, even one single drop of oil, the ENTIRE transaction, including both oil and labor, becomes taxable.

Sales tax and discretionary sales surtax are calculated on each taxable transaction. Florida uses a bracket system to calculate sales tax when a transaction falls between two whole-dollar amounts. Multiply the whole dollar amount by the tax rate (6 percent plus the county surtax rate) and use the bracket system to figure the tax on the amount less than a dollar. The Department of Revenue has rate tables (Form DR-2X) to assist residents.

A "discretionary sales surtax" may be imposed by counties at up to 2.5%, charged at the destination county's rate (if shipped). This is 1% in most counties, 0.5% in many, and 1.5% in a few such as Leon. Effective in 2019, Hillsborough County's surtax rate was raised to 2.5%. A few counties have no additional surtax. Most have an expiration date, but a few do not. Only the first $5,000 of a large purchase is subject to the surtax rate. Most counties levy the surtax for education or transportation improvements.

There are annual sales tax holidays, such as a back-to-school tax holiday in August on clothing, shoes, and school supplies priced below a certain amount that may change each year, as well as one in June 2007 to promote hurricane preparedness. The 2008 Legislators did not enact any sales tax holidays.

Florida also permits counties to raise a "tourist development tax" of up to an additional 13% for stays of 6 months or less on any hotel, apartment hotel, motel, resort motel, apartment, apartment motel, rooming house, mobile home park, recreational vehicle park, condominium, or timeshare resort.

In May 2010, Florida passed a law that capped the sales tax on boats and other vessels at $18,000, regardless of the purchase price. This was to encourage owners not to leave the State after purchase or to flag "offshore", which most owners were doing before the passing of this law. As a result, the Florida Department of Revenue has seen a dramatic increase in sales tax revenues from the sale of boats.

Florida is the only state to charge sales tax on the rental of real estate, commercial, or residential, raising more than a billion dollars a year from the tax. Residential rentals of more than six months are exempt from the tax.

As of 2022, sales tax generates around 80% of Florida's tax revenue.

=== Georgia ===
Georgia has had a 4% state sales tax rate since April 1, 1989, when it was raised from 3%. Services (including postage but not shipping) and prescription drugs are not taxed at all, while over-the-counter drugs, drugstore medical devices, and other basic needs are fully taxed. Since the 1990s, groceries (packaged foods not intended for on-premises consumption) have been exempt from the state sales tax but are still subject to the local sales tax rate. Since the early 2010s, items prepared in grocery stores (even those without cafés), such as fresh bread from the bakery, are taxed as if they were not grocery items, despite clearly being basic needs for consumption at home.

Counties in Georgia may impose local sales tax of 1%, 2%, or 3%, consisting of up to three 1% local-option sales taxes (out of a set of five) as permitted by Georgia law. These include a special-purpose tax (SPLOST) for specific project lists, a general-purpose LOST, a homestead exemption (HOST), and an educational one for public schools (ELOST) which can be put forth for a referendum by the school boards (the county's and any of its cities' must agree), instead of the county commission (in cooperation with its city councils) as the other taxes are. Also, the city of Atlanta imposes an additional 1% municipal-option sales tax (MOST), as allowed by special legislation of the Georgia General Assembly, and last renewed by voters in the February 2016 presidential primaries until 2020. This is for fixing its water and sewerage systems, mainly by separating storm sewers from sanitary sewers. In April 2016, a November referendum for an extra half percent was signed into law for MARTA, but only for the city of Atlanta, after legislators from the wealthy northern suburbs refused to allow the bill to advance unless their districts were excluded. This essentially limits the use of the funds to the Atlanta Beltline through 2057, as it is the only expansion project needed within the city limits, and blocks an extension of the north (red) line to Roswell and Alpharetta, where it is most needed to relieve congestion.

As of March 2016, total sales tax rates in Georgia are 3% for groceries and 7% for other items in 107 of its 159 counties. Seven counties charge only 2% local tax (6% total on non-grocery items), and no county charges 0% or 1%; 45 now charge 4% (8% total) due to the TSPLOSTs. Some partially (but not fully) exempt groceries from the local tax by charging 1% less for non-restaurant food than for other items. Fulton and DeKalb (and since 2015, Clayton) counties charge 1% for MARTA, and adjacent metro Atlanta counties may do so by referendum if they so choose. For the portions of Fulton and DeKalb within the city of Atlanta, the totals are 4% and 3% on groceries, respectively, and 8% on other items due to the MOST, with DeKalb's exemption of groceries from the HOST. Towns and Muscogee counties listed an "other" tax as one of their three 1% taxes.

Starting in 2012, regions defined by a new law were each allowed to vote for a TSPLOST sales tax for funding transportation projects, including public transportation and rapid transit (which only play a significant role in metro Atlanta, and are constitutionally blocked from using the state's fuel tax revenues). Most of the regions voted against it, except for the three regions of middle Georgia from Columbus to Augusta. The TSPLOST is not subject to the 3% limit on local taxes, allowing local rates in those counties to reach up to 8%. In 2015, the situation for alternative transportation in the state was made even worse when the per-gallon excise tax was raised, and the sales tax was eliminated on gasoline, blocking even more state funding from being used for traffic-reducing investments like commuter rail and others.

Similar to Florida and certain other states, Georgia used to have two sales-tax holidays per year, starting in 2002. One was for back-to-school sales the first weekend in August, but sometimes starting at the end of July. A second usually occurred in October, for energy-efficient home appliances with the Energy Star certification. There were no sales-tax holidays in 2010 and 2011, but they were reinstated in 2012 after the worst of the late-2000s recession had passed.

Starting in 2013, Georgia imposed a one-time title ad valorem tax (TAVT) on all vehicles sold within the state (both dealer and private sales are subject to this tax). The TAVT is based on the fair market value of the vehicle. However, Georgia no longer charges sales tax on motorized vehicles, and those purchases that fall into the TAVT taxation system no longer pay the annual ad valorem taxes on vehicles. Essentially, the new TAVT combined the annual vehicle ad valorem tax and sales tax on vehicles. Non-motorized vehicles do not qualify for the TAVT system and are therefore subject to annual ad valorem tax. Vehicles being brought from out of state are also subject to TAVT. Vehicle sales or use taxes paid to other states are not credited towards TAVT in Georgia.

Georgia offers many exemptions to specific businesses and industries, and charities and other nonprofits, such as churches, are exempt. To identify potential exemptions, businesses and consumers must research the laws and rules for sales and use tax and review current exemption forms.

=== Guam ===
Guam has no general sales tax imposed on consumers, except for admissions, use, and hotel occupancy taxes; however, businesses must pay a 5% tax on their monthly gross income. There are no separate municipal, county, school district, or improvement district taxes.

The use tax is 5% on non-exempt personal property imported into Guam. Hotel tax is 11% of the daily room rate. The alcoholic beverage tax varies by beverage. Additionally, there are tobacco, real property, amusement, recreational facility, and liquid fuel taxes.

That Business Privilege Tax rate increased from 4% to 5% effective June 1, 2018. It was originally expected to revert to 4% on October 1, 2018, when Guam was anticipated to enact a 2% sales and use tax. That bill was repealed, and the expiration of the reduced Business Privilege Tax rate was repealed, leaving the 5% rate in effect.

=== Hawaii ===
Hawaii does not have a sales tax per se, but it does have a gross receipts tax (called the General Excise Tax) and a Use Tax which apply to nearly every conceivable type of transaction (including services). It is technically charged to the business rather than the consumer. Hawaii law allows businesses to pass the tax on to consumers, similar to a sales tax.

Unlike other states, rent, medical services, and perishable foods are subject to the excise tax. Also, unlike other states, businesses are not required to show the tax separately on the receipt, as it is technically part of the selling price. Most retail businesses in Hawaii, however, do list the tax as a separate line item. 4.0% is charged at retail with an additional 0.5% surcharge in the City and County of Honolulu (for a total of 4.5% on Oahu sales), and 0.5% is charged on wholesale. However, the state also allows "tax on tax" to be charged, which effectively means a customer can be billed as much as 4.166% (4.712% on Oahu). The exact dollar or percentage amount to be added must be quoted to customers either within the price or alongside it. The 0.5% surcharge on Oahu was implemented to fund the new rail transport system. As with sales tax in other states, nonprofit organizations may apply for an exemption from the tax. Food purchases made through the Supplemental Nutrition Assistance Program are exempt from the excise tax by federal law.

Hawaii also imposes a "use tax" on businesses that provide services that are "LANDED" In Hawaii. One example is: A property owner in Hawaii contracts with a mainland architect to design their home. Even if the architect does all their work on the mainland, they must pay the State of Hawaii a 4% use tax on their fee because the house they designed is located in Hawaii (even if the house is never built). The tax is on the produced product, which is the design and the provided building plans. This applies to commercial property designs as well.

=== Idaho ===
Idaho implemented a 3.0% sales tax in 1965, and the current rate is 6.0%. Some localities levy an additional local sales tax.

=== Illinois ===
Illinois' sales and use tax scheme includes four major divisions: Retailers' Occupation Tax, Use Tax, Service Occupation Tax and the Service Use Tax. The Illinois Department of Revenue administers each of these taxes. The Retailers' Occupation Tax is imposed upon persons engaged in the business of selling tangible personal property to purchasers for use or consumption. The retailer's gross receipts measure it. The base rate of 6.25% is broken down as follows: 5% State, 1% City, 0.25% County. Local governments may impose additional taxes, resulting in a combined rate ranging from the State minimum of 6.25% to 9.00% as of May 2013.

Springfield charges 8.00% total (including state tax). A complementary Use Tax is imposed on the privilege of using or consuming property purchased at retail, regardless of where it is purchased. Illinois registered retailers are authorized to collect the Use Tax from their customers and use it to offset their obligations under the Retailers' Occupation Tax Act. Since the Use Tax rate is equivalent to the corresponding Retailers' Occupation Tax rate, the amount collected by the retailer matches the amount the retailer must submit to the Illinois Department of Revenue. The combination of these two taxes is what is commonly referred to as "sales tax". If the purchaser does not pay the Use Tax directly to a retailer (for instance, on an item purchased from an Internet seller), they must remit it directly to the Illinois Department of Revenue.

The Service Occupation Tax is imposed upon the privilege of engaging in service businesses. The selling price of tangible personal property transferred incident to the provision of a service is used to measure it. The Service Use Tax is imposed upon the privilege of using or consuming tangible personal property transferred as an incident to the provision of a service. An example would be a printer of business cards. The printer owes Service Occupation Tax on the value of the paper and ink transferred to the customer in the form of printed business cards. The serviceperson may satisfy this tax by paying Use Tax to his supplier of paper and ink, or may charge Service Use Tax to the purchaser of the business cards and remit the amount collected as Service Occupation Tax on the serviceperson's tax return. The service itself, however, is not subject to tax.

Qualifying food, drugs, medicines, and medical appliances have sales tax of 1% plus local home rule tax depending on the location where purchased. Newspapers and magazines are exempt from sales tax, as are legal tender, currency, medallions, bullion, or gold or silver coinage issued by the State of Illinois, the government of the United States of America, or the government of any foreign country. Illinois is the only state that imposes a sales tax on all prescription drugs (Georgia does not tax prescription-only medications, but taxes over-the-counter medications even if prescribed by a physician).

Feminine care products, such as tampons and pads, are not subject to sales tax. Illinois is one of only three states with such an exemption (the others being Connecticut and New York).

The city of Chicago has one of the highest combined sales tax rates among major U.S. cities (10.25%). It was previously this high (10.25%); however, it was reduced when Cook County lowered its sales tax by 0.5% in July 2010, another 0.25% in January 2012, and another 0.25% in January 2013. Chicago charges a 2.25% food tax on regular groceries and drug purchases, and has an additional 3% soft drink tax (totaling 13.25%). An additional 1% is charged for prepared food and beverage purchases in the Loop and nearby neighborhoods (the area roughly bordered by Diversey Parkway, Ashland Avenue, the Stevenson Expressway, and Lake Michigan).

Illinois requires residents who make purchases online or while traveling out of state to report those purchases on their state income tax return and pay use tax. In 2014, Illinois passed legislation which required sales tax to be collected by "catalog, mail-order and similar retailers along with online sellers... if they have sales of $10,000 or more in the prior year." Although the law went into effect on January 1, 2015, retailers were given an additional month to comply with the legislation.

=== Indiana ===
Indiana has a 7% state sales tax. The tax rate was raised from 6% on April 1, 2008, to offset the loss of revenue from the statewide property tax reform, which is expected to lower property taxes significantly. Before this, it was 5 percent from 1983 to 2002. It was 6 percent from 2002 to 2008. The rate currently stands at 7 percent. Untaxed retail items include medications, water, ice, and unprepared, raw staple foods or fruit juices. Many localities in the state of Indiana, including counties and cities, also have a sales tax on restaurant food and beverages consumed in the restaurant or purchased to go.

Revenues are usually used for economic development and tourism projects. This additional tax rate may be 1%, 2%, or another amount, depending on the county in which the business is located. For example, in Marion County, the sales tax on restaurant sales is 9%. There is an additional 2% tax on restaurant sales in Marion County to pay for Lucas Oil Stadium and the expansion of the Indiana Convention Center.

=== Iowa ===
Iowa has a 6% state sales tax and an optional 1% local sales tax imposed by most cities and unincorporated portions of most counties, bringing the total to a maximum of 7%. There is no tax on most unprepared food, except candy and soda (Iowa also charges a nickel deposit for each soda container). The Iowa Department of Revenue provides information about local option sales taxes,, including sales tax rate lookup. Iowa also has a sales tax on services when they are rendered, furnished, or performed.

=== Kansas ===
Kansas has a 6.5% statewide sales tax rate, effective July 1, 2015. More than 900 jurisdictions within the state (cities, counties, and special districts) may impose additional taxes. For example, in the capital city of Topeka, retailers must collect 6.5% for the state, 1.35% for Shawnee County, and 1.5% for the city, for a total rate of 9.35%.

Kansas reduced the state-level sales tax on food sales to 4% in 2023, to 2% in 2024, and gone since 2025. Local sales taxes are still imposed.

No sales tax is charged on prescription medicines.

The highest combined rate of sales tax is 12%, in Oakley, near the intersection between U.S. Route 40 and Interstate 70.

=== Kentucky ===
Kentucky has a 6% state sales tax. Most staple grocery foods are exempt. Alcohol sales were previously exempt until April 1, 2009, when a 6% rate was applied to this category as well.

=== Louisiana ===
Louisiana has a 5% state sales tax as of 2025. The state sales tax is not charged on unprepared food. There are also taxes on the parish (county) level and some on the city level; Baton Rouge has a 5% sales tax. Parishes may add local taxes up to 5%, while local jurisdictions within parishes may add more. New Orleans (coterminous with Orleans Parish) collects the maximum 5% tax rate for a total of 10% on general purpose items. For food and drugs the tax rate is 4.5%, for a total of 9.5%. Louisiana bids out sales tax audits to private companies, with many paid on a percentage-of-collected basis.

=== Maine ===
Maine has a 5.5% general, service provider and use tax (raised, temporarily until further notice, from 5% on October 1, 2013). The tax on lodging and prepared food is 8%, and short-term auto rental is 10%. These are all officially known as "sales tax". In July 2021, Maine exempted feminine hygiene products from taxation, reclassifying them as a "grocery staple."

=== Maryland ===
Maryland has a 6% state sales and use tax (raised from 5% in 2007) as of January 3, 2008, with exceptions for medicine, residential energy, and most non-prepared foods (with the major exceptions of alcoholic beverages, candy, soda, single-serving ice cream packages, ice, bottled water [including both still and carbonated water], and sports drinks). While most goods are taxed, many services (e.g., repair, haircuts, accounting) are not. Maryland's sales tax includes Internet purchases and other mail items such as magazine subscriptions. Maryland has a "back-to-school" tax holiday on a limited number of consumer items. On July 1, 2011, the selective sales tax on alcohol was raised from 6% to 9%.

On January 1, 2012, Montgomery County began levying a 5-cent-per-bag tax on plastic and paper bags provided by retailers at the point of sale, pickup, or delivery (with few exceptions, most notably bags for loose produce in grocery stores, bags for prescription drugs, and paper bags at fast-food restaurants). Four cents of this tax go to the county's water quality fund, and one cent is returned to the retailer.

=== Massachusetts ===
Massachusetts has a 6.25% state sales tax on most goods (raised from 5% in 2009). There is no sales tax on food items, but prepared meals purchased in a restaurant are subject to a 6.25% meal tax (in some towns, voters have chosen to add a local 0.75% tax, raising the meal tax to 7%, with that incremental revenue coming back to the town). Sales tax on liquor was repealed in a 2010 referendum vote. Sales of individual clothing items costing $175 or less are generally exempt; for items costing more than $175, sales tax is due only on the amount over $175. There have been attempts by initiative petition referendum voting in Massachusetts state elections to alter the level of sales taxation overall within Massachusetts, or on certain classes of sold items: examples include the aforementioned end of taxation on alcoholic beverages that was up for voting in the 2010 state general election, and the separate overall reduction to a 3% sales tax on most in-state sales that same year.

=== Michigan ===
Michigan has a 6% sales tax. Michigan has a 6% use tax, which applies to items bought outside Michigan and brought into the state, to the extent that sales tax was not paid in the state of purchase. Residents are supposed to declare and pay this tax when filing their annual income tax return. Groceries, periodicals, and prescription drugs are not taxed, but restaurant meals and other "prepared food" is taxed at the full rate. The tax applies to the total amount of online orders, including shipping charges. In February 2022, feminine hygiene products became untaxed.

Local government cannot impose a sales tax.

Michigan raised the sales tax rate to 6% from 4% in 1994. Michigan Ballot Proposal 2015-1, which was opposed by 80% of voters, would have raised the sales and use taxes to 7%. In 2007, Michigan passed a law extending the sales tax to services, but repealed it the day it was set to take effect.

=== Minnesota ===
Minnesota currently has a 6.875% statewide sales tax. The statewide portion consists of two parts: a 6.5% sales tax, with receipts going to the state General Fund, and a 0.375% tax, with receipts going to arts and environmental projects. A statewide referendum passed the 0.375% tax on Nov. 4, 2008, and went into effect on July 1, 2009. Generally, food (not including prepared food, some beverages such as pop, and other items such as candy), prescription drugs & clothing are exempt from the sales tax.

Local units of government may, with legislative approval, impose additional general sales taxes. As of July 1, 2008, an additional 0.25% Transit Improvement tax was phased in across five counties in the Minneapolis-St. Paul metropolitan area for transit development. These counties are Hennepin, Ramsey, Anoka, Dakota, and Washington. A 0.15% sales tax is imposed in Hennepin County to finance the Minnesota Twins' new Target Field. Several cities impose their own citywide sales tax: Minneapolis, Saint Paul, Rochester (all 0.5%), and Duluth (1%). These additional taxes increase the total general sales tax rates to 7.875% in Duluth, 7.775% in Minneapolis, 7.625% in Saint Paul, and 7.375% in Rochester.

Mankato has had a 0.5% sales tax since 1991. Motorized vehicles are exempt from this tax. Effective April 1, 2016, Blue Earth County began imposing a 0.5% sales tax for transportation needs throughout the county.

The following cities imposed a city sales tax starting on October 1, 2019: Elk River 0.5%, Excelsior 0.5%, Rogers 0.25%. Starting on January 1, 2020, West Saint Paul will impose a 0.5% sales tax.

In addition to general sales taxes, local units of government can, again with legislative approval, impose sales taxes on certain items. Current local option taxes include a "lodging" tax in Duluth (3%), Minneapolis (3%), and Rochester (4%), as well as a "food and beverage" tax in Duluth (2.25%).

Alcohol is taxed at an additional 2.5% gross receipts tax on top of the statewide 6.875% sales tax, for a total rate of 9.375%, not including any applicable local taxes. This totals 10.375% in Duluth, 10.275% in Minneapolis, 10.125% in Saint Paul, and 9.875% in Rochester.

=== Mississippi ===
Mississippi has a 7% state sales tax. Cities and towns may implement an additional tourism tax on restaurant and hotel sales. The city of Tupelo has a 0.25% tax in addition to other taxes; the city of Jackson has an additional 1% tax on certain retail sales. Restaurant and fast-food tax is 9%, as in the city of Hattiesburg, for example. The statewide grocery sales tax is 5%, 2% lower than the general sales tax.

=== Missouri ===
Missouri imposes a sales tax upon all sales of tangible personal property, as well as some "taxable services"; it also charges a use tax for the "privilege of storing, using or consuming within this state any article of tangible personal property." The state rate, including conservation and other taxes, is 4.225%, and counties, municipalities, and other political subdivisions charge their own taxes. Those additional local taxes combined with "community improvement district," "transportation development district," and "museum district" taxes can result in merchandise sales taxes in excess of 10%. The state sales tax rate on certain foods is 1.225%.

Missouri provides several exemptions from sales tax, such as purchases by charitable organizations or some common carriers (as opposed to "contract carriers"). Missouri also excludes some purchases from taxation on the grounds that such sales are not sales at retail; these include sales to political subdivisions. The Supreme Court of Missouri in August 2009 ruled that when a sale is excluded from taxation – as opposed to exempt from taxation – the seller must self-accrue sales tax on its purchase of the goods and remit the tax on such purchases it made. This decision was reversed by two similar – but not identical – statutes added during the 2010 general assembly's regular session.

Although the purchaser is obligated to pay the tax, the seller is obligated to remit it; when the seller fails to remit, the obligation to pay falls on the seller. As compensation for this service and as an incentive for timely filing, sellers may retain 2% of all taxes collected each period. There are two exceptions to the general rule that the seller remains liable for the tax if they fail to collect it from the purchaser.

First, no sales tax is due upon the purchase of a motor vehicle that must be titled. Instead, the purchaser pays the tax directly to the Department of Revenue within one month of purchase. As long as the vehicle is taken out of state within that first month of purchase and titled elsewhere, no tax is due in Missouri. Second, if the purchaser presents an exemption certificate to the buyer at the time of sale, then the purchaser may be assessed taxes on the purchase if the certificate was issued in bad faith.

=== Montana ===
Montana has no state sales tax but some municipalities which are big tourist destinations, such as Whitefish, Red Lodge, Big Sky, and West Yellowstone, do (up to 3%). Hotels, campgrounds, and similar lodging charge a "lodging and usage tax", usually at the rate of 7%. Rental car companies charge a 4% tax on the base rental rate.

=== Nebraska ===
Nebraska has a 5.5% state sales tax, with groceries exempt. Municipalities may impose an additional sales tax of up to 1.5%, resulting in a maximum rate of 7%. Specific tax rates per county are available on the web. Omaha also has a 2.5% tax on prepared food and drink.

=== Nevada ===
Nevada's state sales tax rate is 6.85%. Counties may impose additional rates via voter approval or legislative approval; therefore, the applicable sales tax will vary by county, ranging from 6.85% to 8.375% in Clark County. Clark County, which includes Las Vegas, has an additional rate of 1.525% – 0.5% for mass transit, 0.25% each for flood control and to fund the Southern Nevada Water Authority, 0.4% for the addition of police officers in the county, and 0.125% for educational programs. In Washoe County (which includes Reno), the total sales tax rate is 8.265%, due to county option rates for flood control, the ReTRAC train trench project, mass transit, and an additional county rate approved under the Local Government Tax Act of 1991.

For travelers to Las Vegas, note that the lodging tax rate in unincorporated Clark County, which includes the Las Vegas Strip, ranges between 10.5% and 13.38%, depending on the distance of the hotel from the Las Vegas Convention Center and the proximity of the hotel to the Strip and Allegiant Stadium, the home stadium for the Las Vegas Raiders. In Las Vegas, the room tax rate is 13.38% for certain hotels near the Strip and 13% for all other hotels; however, in the city of Henderson, all rooms are taxed at a rate of 13%, regardless of location.

=== New Hampshire ===
No statewide sales tax exists in New Hampshire. However, a 1.5% transfer tax is levied on real estate sales. Taxable meals exclude food and beverages consumed off-premises, but catered and restaurant meals are taxable at the 9% rate.

New Hampshire also imposes excise taxes on gasoline at $0.196 per gallon, cigarettes at $1.78 per pack, and beer at $0.30 per gallon. A tax on the consumption of electricity, at $0.00055 per kilowatt-hour, was repealed starting in 2019.

=== New Jersey ===
The state of New Jersey's sales and use tax rate is 6.625% effective January 1, 2018. Certain items are exempt from tax, notably most clothing, footwear, and food. However, there are exceptions to this statewide rate. In Urban Enterprise Zones, UEZ-impacted business districts, and Salem County, sales tax is collected at 50% of the regular rate (currently 3.3125%) on certain items. In addition, local sales taxes are imposed on sales of certain items sold in Atlantic City and parts of Cape May County. The highest sales tax in the state is in Atlantic City at 12.625% (although certain items are exempt from the additional tax).

A full list of Urban Enterprise Zones is available on the State of New Jersey website.

New Jersey does not charge sales tax on unprepared food (except certain sweets and pet food), household paper products, medicine, and clothing. New Jersey does not charge sales tax on goods purchased for resale or capital improvements, but does charge sales tax on certain services.

New Jersey does not charge sales tax on gas; however, it is subject to a $0.491/gallon excise tax. Cigarettes are subject to a $3/pack excise tax, in addition to sales tax.

=== New Mexico ===
New Mexico imposes a gross receipts tax of 5% on most retail sales or leasing of property or performance of services in New Mexico. The tax is imposed on the seller, but it is common for the seller to pass the tax on to the purchaser. The state rate is 5.125%. Municipalities may assess an additional gross receipts tax, resulting in rates ranging from 5.375% to 8.8625%. Numerous specific exemptions and deductions apply. The tax may increase depending on the state growth.

=== New York ===
The state sales tax rate in New York is 4%.

All counties and cities, by default, are authorized to collect an additional 3% sales tax on top of the state's 4% levy; under the state's home rule laws, counties and cities may only levy a higher sales tax (or a lower one, but this option is not exercised) if it is approved by the New York State Legislature. This approval must be repeated every two years. As of 2025, all but Saratoga, Warren, and Washington counties in New York charge a higher sales tax rate than the 3% default rate. The combined sales tax in Utica, for example, is 8.75%. In New York City, total sales tax is 8.875%, which includes 0.375% charged in the Metropolitan Commuter Transportation District (MCTD).

On September 1, 2007, New York State eliminated the 4% state sales tax on all clothing and footwear if the single item is priced under $110. Most counties and cities have not eliminated their local sales taxes on clothing and footwear. There are, however, ten counties outside New York City as well as New York City that have done so.

Counties that have eliminated their local sales tax on clothing and footwear if the single item is priced under $110 are: Chautauqua, Chenango (outside the city of Norwich), Columbia, Delaware, Dutchess, Greene, Hamilton, Monroe, Putnam, and Tioga. New York State also exempts college textbooks from sales taxes.

Since June 1, 2008, when products are purchased online, and shipped into New York State, some retailers must charge the tax amount appropriate to the locality where the goods are shipped, and, in addition, charge the appropriate taxes on the costs of shipping and handling. The measure states that any online retailer that generates more than $10,000 in sales via in-state sales affiliates must collect New York sales tax. The cumulative gross receipts from sales to New York customers resulting from referrals by all of the seller's resident representatives exceed $10,000 during the preceding four quarterly sales tax periods.

From October 1, 2010, to March 31, 2011, the statewide sales and use tax exemption for clothing and footwear sold for less than $110 was eliminated. For New York City, this meant articles of clothing costing less than $110 were charged 4.375% tax. A state sales tax exemption for clothing and footwear under $55 was reinstated from April 1, 2011, through March 31, 2012. The original ($110) exemption was reinstated after March 31, 2012.

=== North Carolina ===
North Carolina has a state-levied sales tax of 4.75%, effective July 1, 2011, with most counties adding a 2% tax, for a total tax of 6.75% in 51 of the 100 counties. Mecklenburg and Wake counties levy an additional 0.5% tax, which is directed towards funding the light rail system, for a total of 7.25%. Mecklenburg County also imposes an additional 1% tax starting July 1, 2026, bringing its total rate to 8.25%. The total sales tax in 45 other counties is 7%. Durham County and Orange County impose an additional 0.5% tax on the 7% rate to fund public transportation, bringing the total rate to 7.5%. The Wake County Board of Commissioners levied a Prepared Food and Beverage Tax of 1% of the sale price of prepared food and beverages effective January 1, 1993, bringing the total to 8.25%.

There is a 41¢ tax per gallon on gas, a 45¢ tax per pack of cigarettes, a 79¢ tax per gallon on wine, and a 53¢ tax per gallon on beer. Most non-prepared food purchases are taxed at a uniform county tax rate of 2%. Alcohol, electricity, and certain other goods are taxed at a "combined rate" of 7%, which includes both state tax and a 2.25% county tax. Candy, soft drinks, and prepared foods are taxed at the full combined 6.75-7.5% rate, with some counties levying an additional 1% tax on prepared foods. A sales tax holiday on the first Friday in August through the following Sunday, which included school supplies, school instructional materials, clothing, footwear, sports and recreation equipment, and computers and computer accessories, was repealed in 2014 after being in force since 2002.

=== North Dakota ===
North Dakota has a 5% state sales tax for general sales, but varies depending on the category (5% for most retail sales, alcohol at 7%, new farm machinery used exclusively for agriculture production at 3% and new mobile homes at 3%).

- 8.50% in Tioga
- 8.25% in Mandan
- 8.00% in Bismarck, Crosby, Edgeley, Finley, Grafton, Hankinson, Hillsboro, Hope, LaMoure, Leeds, Lidgerwood, New Salem, Northwood, Ray, Rolla, Turtle Lake, West Fargo, Williston, Wilton, & Wyndmere
- 7.75% in Fargo & Park River
- 7.50% in Buffalo, Casselton, Devils Lake, Enderlin, Forman, Harwood, Hatton, Horace, Jamestown, Kenmare, Kindred, Leonard, Lisbon, Mapleton, Max, Medora, Milnor, Minot, Mott, New England, New Rockford, Page, Pembina, Regent, Richardton, Steele, Surrey, Tower City, & Valley City
- 7.25% in Grand Forks

=== Ohio ===
Ohio has a 5.75% state sales tax. Counties may levy a permissive sales tax of 0.25% up to 1.5% and transit authorities, mass transit districts usually centered on one primary county, may levy a sales tax of 0.25% up to 1.5%. Cuyahoga County has the highest statewide sales tax rate (8%). Tax increments may not be less than 0.25%, and the total tax rate, including the state rate, may not exceed 8.75%. County permissive taxes may be levied by emergency resolution of the county boards of commissioners. Transit authority taxes must be levied by a vote of the electors of the district or county, and a vote of the electors of the district or county may levy county permissive taxes.

Shipping and handling charges are also taxable. Ohio law requires virtually every type of business to obtain an Ohio Sales Tax Certificate Number. If someone sells goods on eBay or the internet and ships them to a buyer in the buyer's state of residence, they must collect sales tax from the buyer and remit the tax to the state monthly or quarterly. If someone sells less than $4 million in annual sales, they do not have to collect or pay sales tax on out-of-state sales.

Ohio Sales Tax Resale Certificate Example: If living in Ohio and selling or shipping something to someone else in Ohio, then one must collect and pay sales tax to the State of Ohio. But if selling the same item to someone outside the State of Ohio, one need not charge sales tax, but must report the exempt tax sale to the State of Ohio. Ohio also has a gross receipts tax, called the Commercial Activity Tax (CAT), that applies only to businesses and shares some similarities with a sales tax.

"Food for human consumption off the premises where sold" is exempt from sales tax, except for sodas and alcoholic beverages, which are taxed at the full rate.

=== Oklahoma ===
Oklahoma has a 4.5% sales tax rate. Counties and cities each have an additional sales tax that varies but is generally up to 2% for counties and 2-5% for cities, resulting in a total sales tax rate of 7.5% to 8.5%.

=== Oregon ===
Oregon has no statewide sales tax, although local municipalities may impose sales taxes, such as the 5% prepared food tax in Ashland.

Oregon does collect some business and excise taxes that may be passed along to (or must be collected from) consumers in some form or another. These include a 1% state lodging tax, various tobacco taxes, telecommunications taxes, and "privilege tax" (excise tax) on beer, wine, spirits, and new vehicles. Many localities also collect additional lodging taxes.

=== Pennsylvania ===
Pennsylvania has a 6% sales tax rate. Allegheny County has a local sales tax of 1% on top of the PA sales tax rate, for a total of 7%. Philadelphia County has a local sales tax of 2% on top of the PA sales tax rate, bringing the total to 8%, which took effect on October 8, 2009.

Food, most clothing, and footwear are among the items most frequently exempted. However, taxed food items include soft drinks and powdered mixes, sports drinks, hot beverages, hot prepared foods, sandwiches, and salad bar meals, unless these items are purchased with food stamps. Additionally, catering and delivery fees are taxed if the food itself is taxed.

Additional exemptions include internet service, newspapers, textbooks, disposable diapers, feminine hygiene products, toilet paper, wet wipes, prescription drugs, many over-the-counter drugs and supplies, oral hygiene items (including toothbrushes and toothpaste), contact lenses and eyeglasses, health club and tanning booth fees, burial items (like coffins, urns, and headstones), personal protective equipment for production personnel, work uniforms, veterinary services, pet medications, fuel for residential use (including coal, firewood, fuel oil, natural gas, wood pellets, steam, and electricity), many farming supplies and equipment, ice, and tea (including powdered, hot, cold, and flavored).

The taxability of alcoholic beverages is slightly complicated. In Pennsylvania, alcohol is sold to businesses and consumers through the Pennsylvania Liquor Control Board (PLCB). The PLCB always charges sales tax directly to the purchasing entity. Therefore, if a consumer purchases alcohol in PLCB stores, the sales tax is assessed at the point of purchase, but if a consumer purchases alcohol at a licensed business (such as a bar or restaurant), the sales tax is not applied because it had already been paid when the business purchased the alcohol from the PLCB. The PLCB charges an additional 18% levy on liquor and wine, which is always included in the price regardless of the purchase location. Beer is subject to an excise of $0.08 per gallon.

Gasoline is taxed in Pennsylvania at 57.6 cents/gallon. Diesel is taxed at 74.1 cents/gallon. Both of these figures are the second-highest in the nation, after California.

=== Puerto Rico ===
Puerto Rico has a 10.5% commonwealth sales tax that applies to both products and services, with few exemptions (including items such as unprocessed foods, prescription medicines, and business-to-business services). Additionally, most municipalities have a 1% city sales tax, bringing the total to 11.5%. Some items exempt from the commonwealth sales tax, such as unprocessed foods, are subject to the city sales tax in municipalities.

=== Rhode Island ===
Rhode Island has a state sales tax of 7%. The rate was raised from 5% to 6% as a temporary measure in the 1970s, but has not been lowered since. Rhode Island raised its sales tax from 6% to 7% in the early 1990s to pay for the bailout of the state's failed credit unions. The change was initially proposed as a temporary measure, but was later made permanent. Other taxes may also apply, such as the state's 1% restaurant tax. Many items are exempt from the state sales tax, e.g., food (excluding single serve items), prescription drugs, clothing and footwear (except for individual items priced greater than $250), newspapers, coffins, and original artwork.

=== South Carolina ===
South Carolina has a 6% state sales tax, but when combined with local, county, and hospitality taxes, the maximum sales tax is 10.5%.

In Charleston, the tax rate is 10.5%, including state, county, local option, and hospitality taxes. The City of Myrtle Beach states that mixed liquor drinks can have taxes added up to 16.5%.

As of June 1, 2007, counties and some cities may impose an additional 1% to 3% sales tax. As of mid-2005, 35 of 46 counties do so. Restaurants may also charge an extra 1-2% tax on prepared food (fast food or take-out) in some places. The state's sales tax on unprepared food disappeared completely on November 1, 2007. There is a $300 cap on sales tax for most vehicles.

Additionally, signs posted in many places of business inform that South Carolina residents over the age of 85 are entitled to a 1% reduction in sales tax.

For the benefit of back-to-school shoppers, there is a sales tax holiday on the first Friday in August through the following Sunday, covering school supplies, instructional materials, clothing, footwear, sports and recreation equipment, and computers and computer accessories.

=== South Dakota ===
South Dakota has a 4.2% state sales tax, plus any additional local taxes. An additional 1.5% sales tax is added during the summer on sales in tourism-related businesses, dedicated to the state's office of tourism.

City governments are allowed a maximum of 2% sales tax for local use, especially in Sioux Falls in Minnehaha County. However, they can impose a gross receipts tax on things like lodging, alcohol, restaurants, and admissions. The business passes on these gross receipts and could be considered a sales tax.

Tribal governments may charge a higher local government tax rate by special agreement with the state.

=== Tennessee ===
Tennessee charges 7% sales tax on most items, but 4% on groceries.

Counties also tax up to 2.75% in 0.25% increments. In most places, the county rate is about 2.25%, bringing the total sales tax to about 9.25%. If a county does not charge the maximum, its cities can charge and keep all or part of the remainder. Several cities are in more than one county, but none of these charge a city tax.

The uniform state tax rate used to be 6%. Effective July 1, 2002, the tax rate was raised to 7% except for groceries. The rate for groceries was lowered to 5.5% effective January 1, 2008, to 5% on July 1, 2013, and to 4% on July 1, 2017.

=== Texas ===
The Texas state sales and use tax rate is 6.25% since 1990, but local taxing jurisdictions (cities, counties, transportation authorities, and special purpose districts - which includes "fire control" and "crime control" taxes levied by a city for those specific purposes only, but specifically not including school districts) may also impose sales and use taxes. However, the additional jurisdictions listed can only assess sales tax among themselves, with a combined maximum of 2%; thus, the sales tax rate on any taxable purchase cannot exceed 8.25%. Prepared food, such as restaurant food, is subject to the tax, but items such as medicines (prescription and over-the-counter), feminine hygiene and baby-related items (such as diapers and bottles), food, and food seeds, are not.

Motor vehicle and boat sales are taxed at only the 6.25% state rate; there is no local sales and use tax on these items. In addition, a motor vehicle or boat purchased outside the state is assessed a use tax at the same rate as one purchased inside the state. The sales tax is calculated on the greater of either the actual purchase price or the "standard presumptive value" of the vehicle, as determined by the state, except for certain purchases (mainly purchases from licensed dealers or from auctions).

Lodging rates are subject to a 6% state tax, and local entities may charge additional amounts. For example, the city of Austin levies a 9% hotel/motel tax, bringing the total to 15%, trailing only Houston, which has the highest lodging tax statewide at 17%. Lodging for travelers on official government business is specifically exempt from tax but the traveler must submit an exemption form to the hotel/motel and provide proof of official status.

Texas allows two discounts for merchants as incentives to prepay and timely file sales tax returns: a 0.5% discount for timely filing and payment, and an additional 1.25% discount for prepayment before filing. To qualify for the latter, the merchant must pay a "reasonable estimate", defined as either 100% of the amount owed in the period (monthly or quarterly) for the prior year (e.g. if owed in October 2024, the merchant must prepay the October 2023 amount) or 90% of the current period's liability, and must do so by the 15th of each month (if monthly) or the 15th day of the second month of each quarter (if quarterly).

Texas provides four sales tax holidays per year. The two largest are in April for "emergency preparedness" items such as flashlights and batteries, and in August for "back-to-school items" such as clothing up to $99.99 (except for certain items, such as golf shoes) and school supplies.

=== Utah ===
Utah has a base sales tax rate of 6.1%, comprising a state sales tax of 4.85% and uniform local taxes totaling 1.25%. Additionally, local taxing authorities can impose their own sales tax. Currently, the majority of Utah's aggregate sales taxes range from 6.1% to 8.35%. Utah has a 16.350% sales tax on rental cars in Salt Lake City. The sales tax on food and food ingredients is 3.0% statewide. This includes the state rate of 1.75%, local option rate of 1.0%, and county option rate of 0.25%.

=== Vermont ===
Vermont has a 6% general sales tax. Groceries, clothing, prescription, and non-prescription drugs are exempt. Hotel and meeting room rentals are subject to a 9% rooms tax, and a 9% meals tax is charged on sales of prepared food and restaurant meals. Beer, wine, and liquor sold for immediate consumption are subject to a 10% tax on alcoholic beverages.

Cities and towns may collect an additional 1% local option tax, effectively establishing a 7% sales tax, a 10% rooms-and-meals tax, and an 11% alcoholic-beverages tax. All local option taxes are charged in Brandon, Colchester, Dover, Killington, Manchester, Middlebury, Rutland Town, South Burlington, St. Albans Town, Stratton, Williston, Wilmington, and Winhall. The communities of Brattleboro, Montpelier, Stowe, and Woodstock charge the local option rooms, meals, and alcoholic beverages taxes, but do not charge the local option sales tax. The cities of Burlington and Rutland do not charge the local option rooms or meals taxes. They are authorized by their respective charters to levy their own taxes on meals, lodging, and entertainment. Burlington does collect the local option sales tax.

Motor vehicle sales are subject to a 6% purchase or use tax. Short-term auto rentals are taxed at 9%. Gasoline is taxed at 20 cents per gallon, plus an amount equal to 2% of the average statewide retail price. A Motor Fuel Transportation Infrastructure Assessment fee is also added to the gas tax rate.

Retail sales of spirituous liquors have been subject to the 6% general sales tax since July 1, 2009. Prices set by the Vermont Liquor Control Board include the state's 25% gross receipts tax on the sale of liquor and fortified wines, while beer and wine prices reflect the 55-cent per gallon excise tax paid by bottlers or wholesalers.

=== Virginia ===
Virginia has a sales tax rate of 5.3% (4.3% state tax and 1% local tax). An additional 0.7% state tax (totaling 6%) is applied in the Northern Virginia region (Cities of Alexandria, Fairfax, Falls Church, Manassas, and Manassas Park; and Counties of Arlington, Fairfax, Loudoun, and Prince William) and the Hampton Roads region (Cities of Chesapeake, Franklin, Hampton, Newport News, Norfolk, Poquoson, Portsmouth, Suffolk, and Virginia Beach; and Counties of Isle of Wight and Southampton), as well as Christiansburg, which currently has the highest meals tax in the United States at 12.8%. An additional 1% on top of the general state rate (totaling 6.3%) is applied in Charlotte County, Danville, Gloucester County, Halifax County, Henry County, Northampton County, and Patrick County. A total 7% rate is levied in James City County, Williamsburg, and York County. Food for home consumption as well as certain personal care items are taxed at a uniform 1% local tax as of 2023 after the state tax was eliminated. Cities and counties may also charge an additional "Food and Beverage Tax" on restaurant meals and prepared food sold at grocery stores (including ice cream packages smaller than 16 ounces), up to an additional 4% in counties and 6.5% in cities. Virginia also has a tax on alcohol of 11.5%.

Virginia's use tax also applies at the same rate for out of state purchases (food and hygiene items 1%, non-food 5.3% to 7%) exceeding $100 per year "from mail order catalogs". Various exemptions include prescription and non-prescription medicine, gasoline, and postage stamps, or the labor portion of vehicle repair. "Cost price" does not include separately stated "shipping" charges, but it does include a separate "handling" charge or "shipping and handling" charges if listed as a combined item on the sales invoice.

However, unlike Maryland and West Virginia consumer use tax forms, the Virginia CU-7 Consumer Use Tax Form does not recognize that it is possible to be under-taxed in another state and so only addresses untaxed items. Unlike Maryland's quarterly filing, Virginia's CU-7 is due annually between January 1 and May 1, or may be filed instead with Schedule A to Form 760 or Schedule NPY to Form 760PY. As with all states, Virginia has penalties and interest for non-filing, but Virginia's use tax is no more practically enforceable than that of any other state.

Certain cities and counties in Virginia levy an additional 5¢ plastic bag tax.

=== Washington ===
Washington has a 6.5% statewide sales tax. Local rates vary based on an individual's location at the point of purchase and can total up to 3.1% for a combined rate of 9.6%. In addition, due to the large number of Native American reservations located within the state, sales-tax rates, if any, can vary based on state treaties with each nation.

Since December 2, 2010, unprepared food items and prescription medication have been exempt from sales taxes. Prepared food, over-the-counter medications, and medical marijuana are subject to sales tax.

The sale or lease of motor vehicles for road use incurs an additional 0.3% tax; the rental of a car for less than 30 days incurs an additional state/local tax of 8.9%. When renting a car for less than 30 days in Seattle, the total sales tax is 18.6%. When buying an automobile, if one trades in a car, the state deducts the price of the trade when calculating the sales tax to be paid on the automobile (e.g., purchasing a $40,000 car, and trading a $10,000 car, a person would be taxed on the difference of $30,000 only, not the full amount of the new vehicle).

Residents of Canada and U.S. states or possessions having a sales tax of under 3%, e.g., Oregon, Alaska, and Alberta, are exempt from sales tax on purchases of tangible personal property for use outside the state. Stores at the border will inquire about residency and exempt qualified purchasers from the tax.

A seller of a house or real estate pays excise taxes on the full sale price. The amount varies by county. In King and Snohomish counties, it is up to 1.78%. For example, selling a house for $500,000 will incur $8,900 in tax.

Residents of Washington, who purchase goods for use in Washington, must pay a use tax instead of a sales tax, if any one of four conditions is true: If a Washington resident purchases goods and certain services in other states that do not charge a sales tax or charge a sales tax rate less than the sales tax rate in Washington, or if an out-of-state seller does not collect Washington sales tax, the resident must pay a use tax on all goods that will be used in Washington. Use tax must also be paid if a Washington resident purchases goods from a seller who is not authorized to collect sales tax or if personal property is acquired with the purchase of real property. Washington state does not typically pursue use tax collection for most purchases. However, in 2005, the Washington State Department of Revenue began to make a concerted effort to collect use tax on artworks acquired in other states.

When staying at a hotel (60+ rooms capacity) in Seattle, the sales tax is 15.6%.

The lowest combined state, county, and municipality sales tax rate in Washington is 7% in most of Klickitat and Skamania counties, while the highest combined sales tax in Washington is the 10.4% in some parts of Snohomish County.

The highest sales tax in Washington is on liquor. The spirits sales tax is 20.5% of the value of the product purchased and a $3.7708 per liter spirits liter tax is assessed on spirits sold to consumers.

April 1, 2008 saw tax increases in King County (+.001), Kittitas County (+.003), Mason County (+.001), and the city of Union Gap (+.002).

On July 1, 2008, Washington stopped charging an origin-based sales tax and started charging a destination-based sales tax. This change only applies to transactions beginning and ending within state lines and does not apply to other states. Additionally, Washington started collecting taxes from online retailers that have voluntarily agreed to start collecting the sales tax in return for not being sued for back taxes.

The city of Seattle charges a 10% tax on parking garage fees to fund mass transit. Total tax at parking garages is now 19.5%. This rate was set to increase to 12.5% on January 1, 2011, bringing the parking tax total to 22%.

On November 4, 2008, voters in King County (Seattle) approved a 0.5% increase in the sales tax. Taxes within the city were increased to 9.5% on retail purchases. This increase was supposed to take effect on January 1, 2009, but was postponed until April 2009. (For the first quarter of 2009, the tax rate in Seattle was 9%.)

The midterm elections on November 2, 2010 saw sweeping voter-enacted tax changes through the passage of Initiative 1107. The initiative repealed all taxes imposed by the state legislature on candy, gum, snack foods, carbonated beverages, and bottled water on June 1, 2010. Initiative 1107 also lowered the B&O tax on food products that contain meat. The Department of Revenue stated that all tax rollbacks were to take effect on December 2, 2010, directing retailers to stop collecting the sales tax at that time. The language of the initiative did not require the state to refund any tax previously collected.

Since April 1, 2017, the sales tax in King, Pierce, and Snohomish counties went up by 0.5 percent to fund the third phase of Sound Transit light rail expansion.

=== West Virginia ===
West Virginia was the first U.S. state to enact a sales tax, currently 6%. The sales tax on food was gradually phased out from January 2006 through July 2013. However, prepared food remains taxed at the full rate. Prescription drugs are not subject to sales tax. Credit is allowed for sales or use taxes paid to another state on the purchase.

An individual who titles a motor vehicle with the West Virginia Division of Motor Vehicles must pay a $10 title fee and a 5 percent title privilege tax (rather than the 6% sales tax). For vehicles purchased new by West Virginia residents, the tax is measured by the vehicle's net sales price. For used vehicles and vehicles previously titled in other states, the tax is based on the National Automobile Dealers Association book value at the time of registration. No credit is issued for any taxes paid to another state. Trailers, motorboats, all-terrain vehicles and snowmobiles are also subject to this tax. Since 2007, new residents of West Virginia no longer have to pay the 5 percent title privilege tax when bringing their own vehicles into the state.

=== Wisconsin ===
Wisconsin has a 5% state sales tax, with all counties other than Waukesha and Winnebago assessing their own 0.5% sales tax, primarily to fund county-level initiatives, including county highway maintenance. Milwaukee County levies a 0.9% county sales tax.

The state instituted a 0.1% sales tax in five counties (Milwaukee, Ozaukee, Racine, Washington, Waukesha), effective January 1, 1996, to cover the cost of building a new stadium (now known as American Family Field) for the Milwaukee Brewers. The tax was originally scheduled to be retired in 2014, but the end date was delayed multiple times. The Southeast Wisconsin Professional Baseball Park District board ultimately removed the tax effective April 1, 2020, after collecting $609 million which paid for the majority of stadium construction costs as well as a variety of other capital improvements. There had been talk of extending the tax to pay for Fiserv Forum, the new home of the Milwaukee Bucks, but the plan failed to gain any momentum, and a property tax increase around the arena district funds that venue instead.

Brown County collected a 0.5% tax for all purchases, which funded the remaining cost of a $295 million renovation of Lambeau Field, as well as a payment to the Green Bay Packers to cover part of the cost of operating and maintaining the stadium through the year 2031. The tax ended as of September 30, 2015, but since January 1, 2018, a new 0.5% county sales tax has been collected for county projects in Green Bay.

The municipalities of Lake Delton, Wisconsin Dells, Bayfield, Stockholm (passed by legislature in 2013), Eagle River, and Rhinelander (as of 2017) have also been authorized to adopt an additional "Premier Resort Area Tax", due to their status as popular tourist destinations. Lake Delton and Wisconsin Dells impose, as of 2014, a 1.25% sales tax (for a combined rate of 6.75%) while Bayfield, Stockholm, Eagle River, and Rhinelander (as of 2017) impose an additional 0.5% for a combined rate of 6.0%. As of 2024, the city of Milwaukee has been allowed to levy an additional 2% municipal sales tax for a combined rate of 7.9% in the parts of Milwaukee in Milwaukee County and 7.5% in other counties.

Milwaukee County also has an additional local exposition tax on hotel rooms, car rentals, and food and beverage, which funds the Wisconsin Center Tax District.

In all cases, prescriptions, most foods (except for candy, dietary supplements, soft drinks, and prepared foods), and newspapers, among other items, are exempt from sales tax; however, over-the-counter medications and certain types of repair and installation services are subject to the 5% sales tax rate.

=== Wyoming ===
Wyoming has a 4% state sales tax, with counties adding up to an additional 3%, resulting in a maximum rate of 7%, especially in Cheyenne in Laramie County. In addition, resort district areas may impose an additional 3% tax. Exemptions include food not designed to be consumed on-premises and the sale of agricultural equipment. Unlike most states, in Wyoming, labor falls under the jurisdiction of sales tax. All labor on both tangible and intangible property are taxable; however, labor which permanently modifies real property is exempt.

== Internet transactions ==
Through the Internet's history, purchases made over the Internet within the United States have generally been exempt from sales tax, as courts have followed the Supreme Court ruling from Quill Corp. v. North Dakota (1992) that a state may only collect sales tax from a business selling products over the Internet if that entity has a physical location in the state. This decision was based on the Dormant Commerce Clause that prevents states from interfering in interstate commerce, unless granted that authority by Congress. Some retailers, like Amazon.com, had voluntarily started collecting sales tax on purchases even from states where they do not have a physical presence. Many states also have a line item on their tax returns allowing the payment of state sales tax when an individual or corporation files state income tax.

In May 2013, the Senate passed the Marketplace Fairness Act, which would allow states to collect sales taxes on online purchases. The legislation would give States the tools to collect sales taxes on cross-State sales transactions. The bill received support from retailers including Walmart and Amazon.com, who have claimed that it is unfair not to require online merchants to collect sales taxes. Groups like the National Retail Federation and the Retail Industry Leaders Association have said that requiring online vendors to collect sales taxes will help make brick and mortar retailers more competitive. However, U.S. House Speaker John Boehner stated that it would be difficult to implement such a system due to varying tax codes in different states. The National Taxpayers Union (NTU) spoke out against the bill, along with The Heritage Foundation, which indicated that it would harm Internet commerce and small businesses. Online retailer eBay believes it will hurt some of its sellers and lobbied Congress to exempt businesses that have less than $10 million in out-of-state sales or fewer than 50 employees. The Act failed to pass in either the 112th or 113th Congress.

In October 2017, the state of South Dakota petitioned the Supreme Court to abrogate the Quill decision, citing the ease with which online retailers can now determine the location and appropriate sales tax for purchases compared to the state of the Internet in 1992. Several online retailers, including Wayfair, Overstock.com, and Newegg, submitted petitions opposing South Dakota, stating that the impact would be difficult for small- and medium-sized retailers that would not have easy access to these tools. In January 2018, the Supreme Court agreed to hear the case South Dakota v. Wayfair, Inc. in its 2018 term. Oral arguments were heard by the Supreme Court on April 17, 2018. During oral arguments, South Dakota's attorney general, Marty Jackley, and the U.S. Solicitor General's representative, Malcolm L. Stewart, both posited that if the Court overturns the Quill decision, the ruling must be retroactive and not merely prospective. Several Justices were concerned about the burden that back taxes and ongoing sales and use tax compliance would place on small businesses.

On June 21, 2018, the Supreme Court held that states may charge tax on purchases made from out-of-state sellers, even if the seller does not have a physical presence in the taxing state. The court's 5–4 majority decision overturned Quill, ruling that the physical presence rule decided from Quill was 'unsound and incorrect' in the current age of Internet services.

== Value added tax ==
There is no value-added tax in the United States. There have been proposals to replace some Federal taxes (or add onto them) with a value-added tax.

== History ==
The use of sales taxes by U.S. states dates back at least to the Pennsylvania mercantile license tax, introduced in 1821, though this and other early taxes were not broad-based. Buehler attributes the development of modern state sales taxes to the depression era. He credits Kentucky with the first tax levied exclusively on retailers. The initial tax, passed in 1930, was progressive but was replaced in 1934 with a 3 percent flat-rate tax and then eliminated in 1936. The current Kentucky sales tax was adopted in 1960. The Commerce Clearing House credits Mississippi with the first sales tax in 1930. Forty-five states and the District of Columbia currently impose sales taxes (see Table 1). Twenty-four of the states first levied the tax during the 1930s, six in the 1940s, five in the 1950s, and eleven in the 1960s. Vermont was the most recent state to impose a sales tax in 1969. Alaska, Delaware, Montana, New Hampshire, and Oregon do not levy general sales taxes.

== See also ==
- Gross receipts tax
- Sales tax
- Use tax
- U.S. State Non-resident Withholding Tax
- Sales taxes in Canada
- Tampon tax

State taxation:

- State income tax
- State tax levels in the United States

General:

- Taxation in the United States
- Federal taxation and spending by state
