= Multistate Tax Commission =

The Multistate Tax Commission (MTC) is an interstate instrumentality located in the United States. It is the executive agency charged with administering the Multistate Tax Compact (1967). As of 2021, the District of Columbia and all 50 states except for Nevada are members in some capacity.

Commission members, acting together, attempt to promote uniformity in state tax laws. Its actions do not have the force of law, and member states may opt not to follow its recommendations. The Commission operates a Joint Audit Program to which states separately subscribe. The program audits taxpayers on behalf of multiple states to create efficiency.

States require purchasers of goods who claim exemption from sales tax to provide certification to the seller of such exemption. The Commission has developed a Uniform Sales and Use Tax Exemption Certificate used by most states.

The Multistate Tax Compact provides that the MTC may conduct audits of taxpayers on behalf of those states specifically authorizing such action. The Compact also provides definitions of terms that states may use when drafting their tax laws.

== National Nexus Program ==
The National Nexus Program was created by the Commission in 1990 to facilitate the application of nexus laws to companies engaged in interstate commerce. One of its activities is a multistate voluntary disclosure program, which allows taxpayers with prior year liabilities to anonymously disclose those liabilities to program member States in exchange for the States limiting the number of years that back taxes are due.

== See also ==
- Taxation in the United States
- State sales tax
- State income tax
- Sales taxes in the United States

== Sources ==
- Interstate Tax Uniformity and the Multistate Tax Commission (National Tax Journal (LVII:3, September 2005)
