= Tax holiday =

Temporary reduction or elimination of a tax

A tax holiday is a temporary reduction or elimination of a tax. It is synonymous with tax abatement, tax subsidy or tax reduction. Governments usually create tax holidays as incentives for business investment, although the arrangement has also been characterized as a form of corporate welfare that leads to a redistribution of resources away from smaller businesses and private citizens and towards monopolies and other forms of consolidated wealth.

Tax relief can be provided in the form of tax concessions to assure the investment of new businesses or the retention of existing ones. Tax holidays have been granted by governments at national, sub-national, and local levels, and have included income, property, sales, VAT, and other taxes. Some tax holidays are extra-statutory concessions, where governing bodies grant a reduction in tax that is not necessarily authorized within the law. In developing countries, governments sometimes reduce or eliminate corporate taxes for the purpose of attracting foreign direct investment or stimulating growth in selected industries.

A tax holiday may be granted to particular activities, in particular to develop a given area of business, or to particular taxpayers. Researchers found that on sales tax holidays, households increase the quantities of clothing and shoes bought by over 49% and 45%, respectively, relative to what they buy on average.

== Sales tax holidays in the United States ==
In New York, a statewide sales tax holiday was first enacted by the New York legislature in 1996, enabling the first tax-free week in January 1997. Local governments in New York were given the option of whether or not to participate; most accepted. Since then, the initiative has been adopted by thirteen states. It commonly takes the form of tax-free weekend lasting Friday through Sunday, usually during a major shopping period for necessities, such as just before school starts. During that period, sales tax is not collected on selected items, such as clothing and school supplies. The items subject to the sales tax exemption may also be restricted by price (e.g., clothing up to $100), but consumers are free to buy unlimited quantities of the included items.

As with other sales taxes, visiting residents of non-participating states who purchase tax-free goods (holiday or not) may still have to pay use tax on the goods they take home.

| State (or equivalent) | Items Included | Period | Days |
|---|---|---|---|
| Alabama | clothing, computers, school supplies, books / severe weather preparedness | 3rd weekend in July / last weekend in February | 3 |
| Arkansas | clothing, school supplies, books | 1st weekend in August | 2 |
| Connecticut | clothing | 3rd week in August | 7 |
| District of Columbia | | Repealed | |
| Florida | clothing, school supplies, books | 2nd week in August | 3 |
| Georgia | clothing, school supplies, computers (suspended in 2017) | 1st weekend of August | 4 |
| Iowa | clothing | 1st weekend of August | 2 |
| Louisiana | all TPP – $2,500, hurricane preparedness items – $1,500, firearms, ammunition and hunting supplies | 1st weekend of September | 2 |
| Massachusetts | Most items for which the sales tax would normally apply; purchases up to $2500 included | 2nd weekend of August | 2 |
| Maryland | clothing and footwear | August 14–20 | 7 |
| Maryland | Energy Star products | February 19–21, 2011 | 3 |
| Missouri | clothing, school supplies, computers | 1st weekend in August | 3 |
| New Mexico | clothing, school supplies, computers | 1st weekend of August | 3 |
| North Carolina | Repealed as of July 1, 2014 | | |
| Oklahoma | clothing | 1st weekend of August | 3 |
| South Carolina | clothing, school supplies, computers | 1st weekend of August | 3 |
| Tennessee | clothing, school supplies, computers | Last Friday of July | 3 |
| Texas | emergency supplies (e.g. batteries, flashlights) | 3rd weekend of April | 3 |
| Texas | electrical products (e.g. air conditioners, light bulbs) with the Energy Star label | Memorial Day weekend in May | 3 |
| Texas | water products (e.g. toilets, soaker hoses) with the Water Sense label | Memorial Day weekend in May | 3 |
| Texas | clothing, diapers, backpacks, school supplies | 2nd weekend of August | 3 |
| Virginia | clothing, school supplies, green appliances, hurricane preparedness items | May, August, October | 3 |

Five US states (Alaska, Delaware, Montana, New Hampshire, and Oregon) do not impose general sales taxes at all but may have excise taxes on specific categories of goods such as gasoline, E911, cigarettes, alcohol, or meals. See Sales taxes in the United States for details.

Some governments create tax-free weekends as incentives for business investment.
