= Transaction privilege tax =

Transaction privilege tax (TPT) refers to a gross receipts tax levied by the state of Arizona on certain persons for the privilege of conducting business in the state. TPT differs from the "true" sales tax imposed by many other U.S. states as it is imposed upon the seller or lessor rather than the purchaser or lessee. The seller/lessor may pass the burden of the tax on to the purchaser/lessee, but the seller or lessor is the party that remains ultimately liable to Arizona for the tax. TPT is imposed under 16 separate business classifications: amusement, commercial lease, job printing, membership camping, mining, owner builder sales, personal property rental, pipeline, prime contracting, private car line, publication, restaurant, retail, telecommunications, transient lodging, transporting, and utilities. (Effective November 1, 2006, the Arizona State Legislature repealed the membership camping classification statute, reducing the total number of tax classifications from 17 to 16.) State tax rates for the various classifications are as follows: 5.5% for the transient lodging classification, 3.125% for the mining classification, 0% for the commercial lease classification, and 5.6% for all other tax classifications. Taxes are imposed on the total gross receipts of taxable businesses, with the exception of prime contractors, who are taxed on 65% of their gross receipts. All gross receipts for a person subject to tax under a particular tax classification are subject to tax unless otherwise specifically exempted or excluded by statute. Exemptions and deductions of one tax classification may not be used under another classification unless specifically delineated.

== Arizona county taxes ==
Arizona county excise taxes "piggyback" the imposition of the state's TPT. All sales subject to TPT are also subject to applicable county excise taxes.

== Arizona city taxes ==
The imposition of Arizona city privilege taxes is separate and distinct from the imposition of state TPT. The League of Arizona Cities and Towns created the Model City Tax Code (MCTC) for the purposes of imposing and administering city taxes. All Arizona cities utilize the MCTC in the imposition of their privilege and use taxes. Certain local options and model options exist, allowing each city to alter or qualify the imposition of its privilege tax or use tax.

== See also ==
- Tax
- Sales tax
- Sales taxes in the United States
