= 2015 Michigan Proposal 1 =

Proposal 1
- Increase sales and use taxes to 7% and increase gas tax and vehicle registration fees; dedicate revenue to transportation purposes

Results
Choice	Votes	%
Yes	349,862	19.93%
No	1,406,019	80.07%
Total votes	1,755,881	100.00%
- County results No 90–100% 80–90% 70–80% 60–70%

2015 Michigan Proposal 1, also known as the Michigan Sales Tax Increase for Transportation Amendment, was a referendum held on May 5, 2015, concerning a legislatively-referred ballot measure. The measure's approval would have caused one constitutional amendment and 10 statutes to go into effect. It is estimated that Proposal 1 would raise state revenues from sales and use taxes by $1.427 billion, fuel taxes by $463 million, truck registration fees by $50 million, and vehicle registration fees by $10.1 million in the first year. If approved, the proposal was estimated by the Associated Press to result in an average tax increase of $545 per household in 2016.

The proposal was defeated in an historic landslide, receiving support from only 20% of voters. (Note: "With all counties reporting, 1.4 million Michiganders voted no on Proposal 1 while less than 351,000 voted yes, according to the Michigan Secretary of State's office. The 80-20 rejection was the most one-sided loss ever for a proposed amendment to the state constitution of 1963, records show.")

== Background ==
Proposal 1, consisting of House Joint Resolution UU of 2014 and associated bills, was passed on the last day of the 97th Legislature of Michigan, December 19, 2014. The legislation was created as a solution to a legislative impasse on road funding, with the state House and Senate unable to agree on legislation to create new funding for Michigan roads. Both the House- and Senate-approved plans would have allocated an additional approximately $1.2 billion annually for road and bridge maintenance. The House-approved plan would have allocated this money by cutting spending increases in other areas, including schools. The Senate-approved plan would have raised the money through higher fuel taxes.

The two chambers unable to compromise, and both plans were discarded in favor of Proposal 1. House Joint Resolution UU was passed with the requisite supermajority vote in either chamber, and ten additional bills were passed and signed into law containing enacting clauses that stipulate they only take effect if HJR UU is adopted by voters.

== Contents ==
Proposal 1 consists of an amendment to the Constitution of Michigan, House Joint Resolution UU of 2014. Separately from the constitutional amendment, Public Acts 467 through 476 of 2014, signed into law by Governor Rick Snyder in January 2015, contain enacting sections that specify they do not take effect "unless House Joint Resolution UU of the 97th Legislature becomes a part of the state constitution of 1963 as provided in section 1 of article XII of the state constitution of 1963." The language of the proposal that appears on the ballot describes some aspects of these ten additional laws, acknowledging that giving effect to these ten laws is a major part of the proposal.

== Ballot title ==
Per Michigan law, Michigan Bureau of Elections Director Chris Thomas wrote the ballot title for Proposal 1. The language was approved 3–1 by the Board of State Canvassers; the dissenting voter was Norman Shinkle, a Republican-appointed member of the Board, who noted, "This is a very complex proposal based on interplay of changing the constitution and the laws of Michigan".

The proposal appeared on ballots as follows:

A proposal to amend the State Constitution to increase the sales/use tax from 6% to 7% to replace and supplement reduced revenue to the School Aid Fund and local units of government caused by the elimination of the sales/use tax on gasoline and diesel fuel for vehicles operating on public roads, and to give effect to laws that provide additional money for roads and other transportation purposes by increasing the gas tax and vehicle registration fees.

The proposed constitutional amendment would:

- Eliminate sales / use taxes on gasoline / diesel fuel for vehicles on public roads.
- Increase portion of use tax dedicated to School Aid Fund (SAF).
- Expand use of SAF to community colleges and career / technical education, and prohibit use for 4-year colleges / universities.
- Give effect to laws, including those that:
  - Increase sales / use tax to 7%, as authorized by constitutional amendment.
  - Increase gasoline / diesel fuel tax and adjust annually for inflation, increase vehicle registration fees, and dedicate revenue for roads and other transportation purposes.
  - Expand competitive bidding and warranties for road projects.
  - Increase earned income tax credit.

== Policies that would be enacted ==
=== Sales tax increase ===
The largest tax increase in the proposal is the raising of Michigan's state sales tax from 6% to 7%. An additional law, Public Act 553, passed in December 2014 and taking effect in October 2015, will require certain Internet retailers, such as Amazon.com, to collect Michigan's sales tax at the point of purchase. The constitutional amendment would allow for the sales tax increase, and Public Act 474, put into effect by the proposal, would immediately raise the sales tax to the newly authorized rate.

=== Fuel tax modification and increase ===
The proposal would exempt gasoline and diesel fuel used to operate a motor vehicle from the state sales tax and instead increase in the wholesale fuel tax.

The Mackinac Center for Public Policy reports, "The state currently imposes both sales tax and a per-gallon excise tax on motor fuel. This excise tax along with vehicle license and registration fees are the primary source of revenue for the state's road maintenance budget. Under the measure, sales tax would no longer be imposed on fuel and the motor fuel tax would be replaced with a new wholesale tax levied at higher rates than currently. At a listed price of $2 per gallon, the state is currently collecting 29 cents per gallon in sales and excise taxes on gasoline. This proposal would increase those collections to 41.7 cents per gallon."

Additionally, the retail sales tax on gasoline is expressly eliminated only for vehicles "driving on Michigan roads." It is not eliminated for off-road vehicles, including boats, agricultural machines, ATVs, snowmobiles, and other gasoline-powered vehicles and tools.

=== Vehicle registration fee increase ===
Vehicle registration fees would no longer depreciate with the value of the vehicle, raising fees overall. Additionally, because vehicle registration fees are no longer ad valorem (based on value) they would no longer qualify as a federal tax line-item deduction. The Anderson Economic Group estimated Michigan residents would pay an additional $102 million in federal taxes caused by this change.

State Rep. Mike McCready, who sponsored the vehicle registration fee bill, said that legislative leaders knew that change would eliminate the federal deductions. McCready said that the legislature chose to eliminate the depreciation discounts for new vehicles, rather than increase the tax rate for all vehicles, because the legislature "felt this would be the least painful [option]".

=== Funding for roads ===
Michigan's proposed fiscal year 2015–16 budget contains cuts in discretionary funding for roads from $285 million the previous year and $451 million in 2014. The proposed amount for fiscal year 2015–16 is $113 million, according to the House Fiscal Agency.

Governor Snyder described the continuing cuts as intentional, saying "that's why this needs to get approved."

Proposal 1 would increase spending on roads by approximately $400 million in the first year, $800 million in the second, and $1.2 billion in subsequent years. Under Public Act 468 (part of the proposal) for the 2015–16 fiscal year, $400 million of $1.2 billion raised from increasing fuel taxes would go to the Michigan Transportation Fund (MTF); the remaining money would be used to pay down a portion of the state's debt from previous road construction projects. For the 2016–17 fiscal year, $800 million of the $1.2 billion would go to the MTF, and starting in the 2017–18 fiscal year, nearly all of the projected $1.35 billion in fuel tax revenue would go to the MTF. "However, the language in the bill does not earmark a portion of the additional revenue resulting from the bill, but a portion of the total revenue generated by the Act. As a result, the language would result in a 56.6%, or $522.2 million, decline in MTF revenue available for roads."

=== Funding for schools and local governments ===
Proposal 1 would have modified funding for schools and local governments.

=== Changes in School Aid Fund usage rules ===
Proposal 1 would have made changes to School Aid Fund usage rules.

=== Earned Income Tax Credit expansion ===
The Michigan Earned Income Tax Credit (MEITC) was amended in 2011, reducing the credit to eligible taxpayers from 20% of the federal Earned Income Credit to 6%. Proposal 1 would give effect to a law that increases that credit back to 20% of the federal amount. This is estimated to provide $260 million in tax relief to qualified individuals in the first year.

The Institute on Taxation and Economic Policy estimated that if Proposal 1 passes, the average recipient of the MEITC who earns less than $20,000 will see a net tax break of $24. The Mackinac Center for Public Policy estimated that, if passed, Proposal 1 would result in typical Michigan families seeing an increase of $500 in taxes per year. Taxpayers who qualify for the MEITC would have, on average, a net tax break of $69; however, some MEITC recipients might see a tax increase.

=== New competitive bidding rules ===
Public Act 472, an act modifying and consolidating public bidding rules for road projects, was dependent on this proposal for implementation.

=== Warranty expansion and affirmative action rules ===
Public Act 473, which takes effect if and only if Proposal 1 is adopted by voters, modifies rules for road contraction, including new affirmative action rules and warranty requirements.

MichiganVotes.org summarized the bill as "to expand to local road agencies a requirement to warranties from contractors for road construction and preservation projects valued at more than $1 million. Under current law the warranty requirement only applies to the state Department of Transportation. Also, to require the Department of Transportation to give extra assistance (possibly including grants and loans) to "disadvantaged" businesses that bid on state funded road projects; and to take other steps to steer more state-funded road work to such firms, including annual consultations with certain ethnic- and race-based organizations."

=== Policies subject to change ===
Proposal 1 consists of a constitutional amendment that could not be modified without a subsequent vote of the people of Michigan, but the ten laws that take effect if Proposal 1 passes, Public Acts 467 through 476 of 2014, containing most of the significant policy changes, are ordinary laws that are written as to only take effect if the Proposal 1 is adopted. These laws could be modified by the legislature at any time, before or after May 5, 2015, and before or after they are scheduled to take effect.

== Public polling ==
A late-March statewide poll by Lansing-based EPIC-MRA found that 70 percent of voters were opposed to Proposal 1, with only 21 percent in favor. The remaining 9 percent of voters were undecided.

== Arguments ==
=== Support ===
There are three principal arguments advanced by "Safe Roads Yes!", the ballot committee supporting the proposal: Proposal 1 (1) guarantees that all taxes on gasoline are allocated to transportation; (2) guarantees that all money in the School Aid Fund goes toward K-12 education; and (3) extends pavement warranties so that road builders pay for repairs to poorly constructed roads.

The proposal was to remove the sales tax from Michigan fuel sales. This was claimed to remedy the anomalous perverse situation where "Michigan charges some of the highest taxes on fuel in the nation, but still has among the lowest per-lane-mile spending on roads." (Note: "Taking the sales tax off fuel allows a sharp hike in the fuel tax — which is spent on roads — without significantly increasing the pump price. And bumping up the sales tax more than replaces the money schools and local governments would lose as a result of a sales tax no longer being charged on fuel.")

Nolan Finley, editor of The Detroit News (which also endorsed Proposal 1), wrote in support, "There is no Plan B". Finley argued that the option of cutting spending from other areas of the budget will not work, as "Republicans aren't going to make substantial cuts to prison spending, Democrats aren't going to hack welfare spending, and neither party is going to touch school spending." Finley noted that, in his opinion, the best course of action would be to raise the money through an increased fuel tax; however, the legislature had been unable to pass such a bill last session and would likely be unable to do so now. Finley concluded by saying that if the proposal fails, revenue increases will be off the table, making Proposal 1 the only option. "So the real message to voters should be this: Hold your noses and vote for Prop 1, or keep driving on what may be the deadliest roads in America. Guaranteed."

MLive Media Group, in its editorial endorsement of Proposal 1, argued that has been under investing in infrastructure, schools, and municipalities for too long, and that the only way to rectify this is through a tax increase. The editorial argued that "[t]here is no viable alternative." The editorial also contested claims by opposition groups, saying, "Schools and municipalities are not 'special interests,' as Proposal 1 opponents cynically call them."

=== Opposition ===
Opponents of Proposal 1 argue that tax increases are unnecessary to fix the roads. They use as an example an alternative proposal passed by the Michigan House that would not raise taxes in December 2014, supported by then-speaker Jase Bolger.

In an op-ed published by MLive, Rep. Tom McMillin made three arguments to show that tax increases were not necessary: (1) Noting that the state's budget increased close to $5 billion from 2012 to 2015 and that the tax increase only raises $2 billion annually, the new taxes would only offset new spending, which has not gone to roads; (2) in 2014, the state House passed a bill "to fully fix and fund roads without any tax increases, by simply prioritizing new spending", but the governor blocked the legislation; and (3) "[r]oads are an ordinary budget item in forty-nine states", and road funding should just be "budget discussions, not some political hostage brought before voters to demand higher taxes".

An editorial in the Battle Creek Enquirer contested the assertion that there is no alternative to fixing roads but Proposal 1: "Proposal 1 proponents are calling the initiative our best—even only—hope for addressing the state's crumbling infrastructure. The governor and others remind us that 'there's no Plan B.' That's a lot of bunk, and it's insulting to voters who shouldn't be in this position. We pay legislators to legislate, and we expect the governor to lead. No elected leaders should be hiding behind voters on this." (Note: "We're no fans of the shell games that typify monetary policy in Lansing, so it's an understatement to say we're dismayed by the circuitous route the Legislature has taken to raise revenue for Michigan's crumbling roads. It amounts to extortion, and as much as we support new taxes to maintain—or, more accurately, rebuild—our state's infrastructure, we won't be endorsing Proposal 1 on the May 5 ballot")

Concerned Taxpayers of Michigan, a group opposed to Proposal 1, argued that the political ramifications of Proposal 1 were an additional reason to vote no: "If Proposal 1 is passed, the public will have shown to the politicians that they accept their worst. That We the People will settle for anything: the worst they can do, we'll accept as the best."

Critics of Proposal 1 have also pointed out that just over half of the tax revenue raised by Proposal 1 would go toward road funding, with 40% going toward schools, revenue sharing with local governments, and other projects unrelated to roads.

== Endorsements ==
=== Support ===
The campaign supporting Proposal 1 is being led by the Safe Roads Yes committee. The largest contributor to Safe Roads Yes as of the February 2015 disclosure was the Michigan Infrastructure Transportation Association.

Groups in favor of Proposal 1 include AFL–CIO of Michigan, the Michigan Association of School Administrators, the Michigan Education Association, the Michigan Environmental Council, the Michigan Farm Bureau, the Michigan Municipal League, the Michigan Public Transit Association, and Michigan School Business Officials.

=== Opposition ===
Four ballot committees are filed in Michigan opposing Proposal 1: Concerned Taxpayers of Michigan, led by former State Rep. Tom McMillin; Coalition Against Higher Taxes and Special Interest Deals, led by former congressional candidate and businessman Paul Mitchell; Protect Michigan Taxpayers, led by Keith Allard; and Citizens Against Middle Class Tax Increases, led by political consultant John Yob.

At least 33 county and congressional district Republican committees passed resolutions expressing official opposition to Proposal 1. In a news release issued by district chairman Tom McMillin as his committee passed such a resolution, McMillin commented "In my 25 years of activism within the Republican party, I've never seen anything like this—so many District and County Republican party committees coming out against a significant proposal by a sitting Republican Governor."

Republican Attorney General Bill Schuette criticized the proposal, saying, "From a policy perspective, this proposal has a lot of potholes and pitfalls. It's a massive $1.9 billion sales tax increase that goes well beyond road funding. There's just too much under the tree."

Numerous other organizations have made official statements opposing Proposal 1, including several Tea Party groups, the Michigan Taxpayers Alliance, the National Federation of Independent Business, the Wayne County Taxpayers Association, Inc., Our America Initiative, the Libertarian Party of Michigan, the Green Party of Michigan, and the Socialist Party of Michigan.

== Alternatives ==
A package of three bills supported by then-Speaker Jase Bolger were passed in December 2014 to fund roads by redirecting new spending to roads. Bolger published an op-ed in the Detroit Free Press defending the plan. The plan has been re-introduced by Rep. Gary Glenn and Todd Courser. Thirteen additional House representatives are co-sponsors of the legislation in 2015.

Senator Patrick Colbeck has also proposed multiple solutions.

== Results ==
The proposal was defeated by a grass-roots campaign, with opposition out-funded by a factor of 20 to 1 by the proposition. (Note: "This year's thumping occurred even though the measure was backed by Gov. Rick Snyder as well as the Republican and Democratic legislative leaders from last year's Michigan House and Senate. The Safe Roads Yes campaign ended up amassing about $9.5 million, nearly 20 times as much money as the $350,000 the three opposition campaigns had combined.") It was an unprecedented defeat of a constitutional proposal in Michigan. (Note: "The prior low mark was set in 1980, when 78.8 percent of the electorate beat back a measure called Proposal A that would have shifted taxes to ensure equal school funding among all school districts in the state, according to state records. It was up against two property tax relief measures that attracted more votes even though they also were struck down.")

Proposal 1
Choice	Votes	%
For	349,862	19.93
Against	1,406,019	80.07
Total	1,755,881	100.00

=== Aftermath ===
Governor Rick Snyder said he would immediately try to find a fix. He has promised to work with the legislature an effort to find a new solution to the state's road funding conundrum. But he had no estimated time of arrival for a result, noting that the legislature has other pressing issues, including the budget, on its agenda. (Note: ""The people have spoken," Snyder said in a conference call with reporters. "What do you do then? You learn from your experience. We roll up our sleeves and get to work. ... This is a critical issue." Snyder said that he did not view the rejection of Proposal 1 as proof that Michigan voters don't want a tax increase to pay for road repairs. "A larger concern appeared to be sending the issue to voters, rather than coming up with a road funding fix in the Legislature, he said. "People want better roads," Snyder said. "The question is, where do you get the resources to do that?"") Moving governmental expenditures is said to be "Plan B," especially given that this legislature is even more anti-tax and conservative than the one that passed the defeated proposal.

== See also ==
- List of Michigan ballot proposals
