= Gross receipts tax =

Corporate tax

A gross receipts tax or gross excise tax is a tax on the total gross revenues of a company, regardless of their source. A gross receipts tax is often compared to a sales tax; the difference is that a gross receipts tax is levied upon the seller of goods or services, while a sales tax is nominally levied upon the buyer (although both are usually collected and paid to the government by the seller). This is compared to other taxes listed as separate line items on billings, are not directly included in the listed price of the item, and are not a factor in markup or profit on company sales. A gross receipts tax has a pyramid effect that increases the actual taxable percentage as it passes through the product or service lifecycle.

Another pyramid effect of the tax comes from the fact that such a tax by definition is levied against itself (in the sense that a business subject to a gross receipts tax will raise its prices to compensate, which in turn increases its gross revenue, which increases the tax owed, and so on in circles) and therefore amounts to a tax on tax. Thus, the actual tax rate of a gross receipts tax is always slightly higher than the nominal tax rate. This is easiest to discern in jurisdictions like Hawaii where businesses are allowed to visibly pass on gross excise tax to their customers.

== Criticism ==
Economists have criticized gross receipts taxes for encouraging vertical integration among companies and imposing different effective tax rates across different industries.

== United States ==
Several states in the United States have imposed gross receipts taxes.

- Alabama - Per Article 3 of the code of Alabama, the state has imposed this type of tax on most utilities.
- Delaware - Business and occupational gross receipts tax rates range from 0.096% to 1.92%, depending on the business activity.
- Florida - A tax of 2.5% is imposed on "gross receipts from the sale, delivery, or transportation of natural gas, manufactured gas, or electricity to a retail consumer in Florida," referring to utility companies (suppliers of electrical power).
- Hawaii - Hawaii imposes its General Excise Tax (GET) as a gross receipts tax on all business done in Hawaii, at 0.5% for wholesaling and manufacturing, 0.15% for insurance commissions, and 4% (4.5% in Honolulu County) for all other activities. Businesses may pass on the GET as a sales-tax-like surcharge but are not required to do so.
- Illinois - Illinois policy makers are considering a 1% gross receipts tax to increase the foundation level for Illinois public schools, as well as to fund a host of educational accountability initiatives. The tax is expected to generate enough revenue to replace the state share of the retail sales tax, corporate franchise taxes, and corporate income taxes. Proponents claim that it is simple for both the government and business to administer, easy for the public to understand, broad-based, stable, and progressive. An editorial article in the Chicago Tribune called it "the best idea" for education funding reform, but some statewide business leaders have rushed to condemn it.
- Nevada - Nevada adopted a Commerce Tax in 2015. Businesses are taxed on Nevada gross receipts in excess of $4 million at a rate varying from 0.051% to 0.331%, depending upon economic sector.
- New Mexico - The gross receipts tax rate varies throughout the state from 5.125% to 8.6875% with local option taxes imposed at the city and county levels, added to the statewide base tax rate of 5%.
- Oregon - Oregon levies a Commercial Activity Tax on businesses with more than $1 million of taxable revenue per year. This tax is equal to $250 plus 0.57% of the taxpayer's revenue.
- Ohio - Ohio imposes a Commercial Activity Tax on businesses with taxable gross receipts of $150,000 or more per year.
- Pennsylvania - Either 5% or 5.9% for most applicable industries. Tax stands at 1% for private bankers, and the tax on natural gas was repealed during the industry's deregulation. The City of Philadelphia additionally imposes a Business Income and Receipts Tax, a portion of which is based on gross receipts.
- Washington - Business and Occupation Tax (B&O).

In addition to these states, Texas has a "margin tax" on certain corporate net revenues.

The District of Columbia imposes a gross receipts tax on the gross revenue of certain public utilities.

== See also ==
- Sales taxes in the United States
- Turnover tax
