= Tennesseans for Fair Taxation =

Political advocacy organization in Tennessee, United States

Tennesseans for Fair Taxation (TFT) is a Tennessee political advocacy group advocating tax reform, particularly at the state level.

As a grassroots group of generally low and moderate income families, Tennesseans for Fair Taxation is allied with state public employee and schoolteacher groups, along with faith-based organizations and good government groups, in establishing a progressive, broad-based state income tax as part of a larger tax modernization package that would also repeal the food tax and reduce the sales tax. This group notes that Tennessee is shown by almost all objective measures to have one of the lowest per capita level of taxes of the fifty U.S. states but that the tax share is disproportionately placed upon poorer people. This is because the majority of state tax revenues in Tennessee are derived from a sales tax, which applies to food, clothing, furniture, car parts, and other necessities, but not private school tuition, real estate investments, attorney fees, or stocks and bonds (except for interest earned and dividends, which are taxed at 6 percent under the Hall income tax, Tennessee being the only state with this provision). In Tennessee, food for human consumption is taxed at 5.5% (This was lowered from 6 to 5.5% in January 2008) and most other items of commerce at 7%, with local jurisdictions empowered to add as much as another 2.75% to this, making the overall sales tax rate in many jurisdictions, including the major urban areas, 8.25% on food and 9.75% on other items.

== Argument ==
The argument advanced by TFT is a twofold one. The first point is that Tennessee governmental services are as a whole inadequate, in large part due to an inadequate tax base and the heavy dependence on one revenue source. Because of the shift to a service-based economy, exacerbated by the growth of internet sales, the sales tax has been eroded over many years. The second is that the poor pay a share of tax that is out of proportion to their income, in that most poor people consume the entire amount of their income and are hence taxed upon all of it, whereas most wealthier people invest some or much of their income, or spend it on non-taxable items like private school tuition and accounting services, and hence are not taxed on it by the state. Therefore, the argument goes, the poor are disproportionately taxed by the existing Tennessee system.

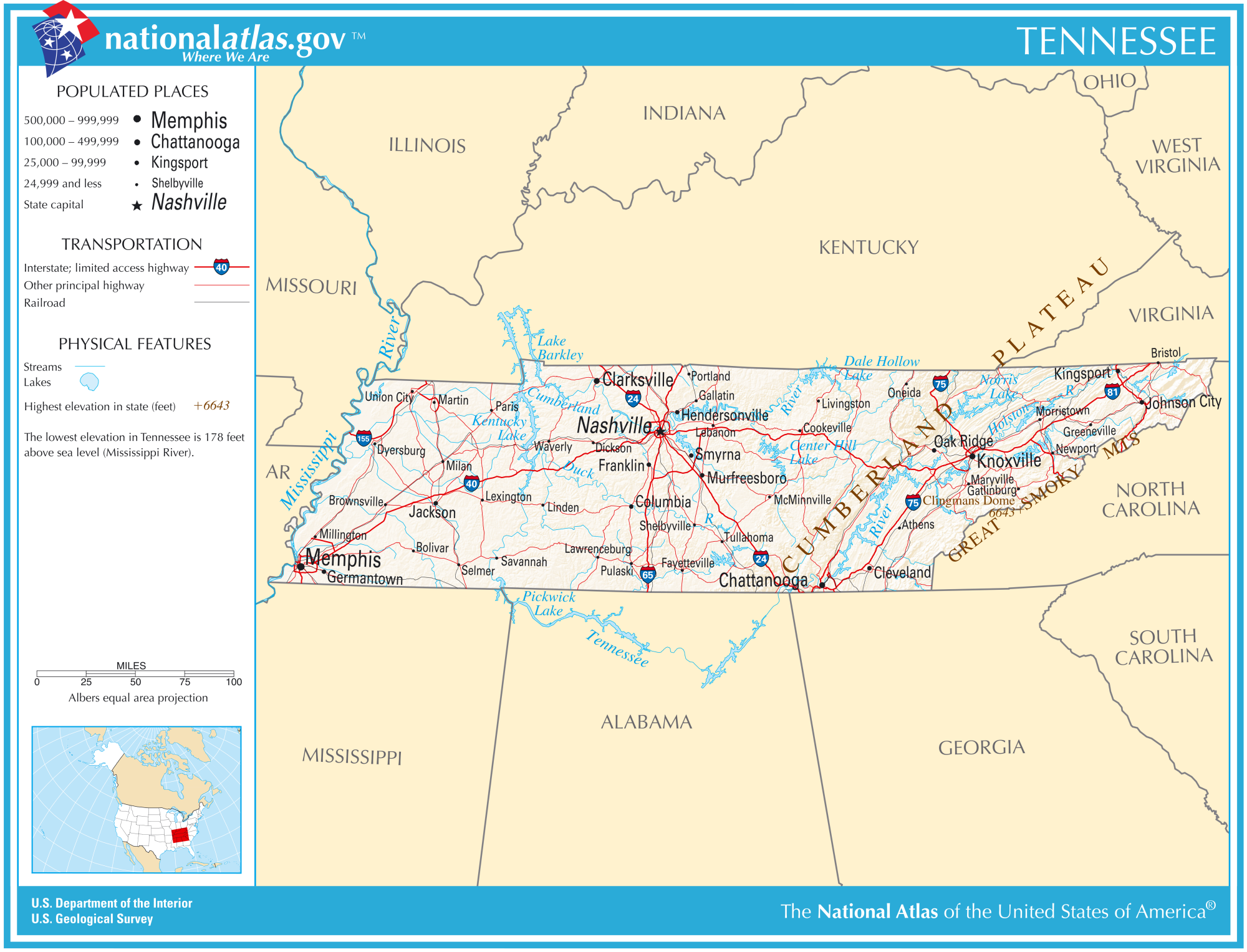
Map of Tennessee

A further point made is that due to the size and shape of Tennessee, and the location of its major population centers, half of the population of the state lives within 20 miles of at least one other state and that all of the population lives no more than 65 miles from at least one other state, and that all of the surrounding states have a lower overall sales tax rate than Tennessee, meaning that many Tennesseans tend to make many purchases, especially major ones, in surrounding states, with Tennessee receiving no revenue from such transactions whatever, in essence making Tennesseans major taxpayers in surrounding states.

TFT also made the point that even many affluent Tennesseans could benefit from the fact that state income taxes are deductible from for purposes of computing liability for federal income tax, whereas sales taxes (as of 2003), were not. The Congress changed this in October 2004. However, since those who the sales tax impacts the most are the least likely to itemize, this recent change has little effect.

== Counter argument ==
The counter-argument is made by groups such as Tennessee Tax Revolt First, that the overall burden of taxation imposed by all levels of government, including the federal government, shows that poorer Tennesseans, like poorer Americans in general, pay a lower share of their income in taxes overall than wealthy ones. They add that the portion of food purchased by persons using food stamps, which covers at least part of their groceries, is automatically tax-exempt. Further, they argue true "fairness" is epitomized by the sales tax, which is the only tax which directly affects persons who work in the so-called underground economy which is driven by cash. Hence it represents the only tax paid by undocumented aliens, drug dealers, pimps and prostitutes. Of course, people can also avoid the sales tax buy buying things under the table with cash. They further point out that Tennessee does impose a flat income tax of 6% on dividends and some interest, called the Hall income tax. This income tax was paid almost entirely by more affluent Tennesseans, since the first $1,250 of such income, and all such income from bank interest payments, is exempt. The Hall Tax was repealed on January 1, 2021.

== Goals ==
TFT hopes to overcome the general resistance to a state income tax by showing that somewhere between two-thirds and four-fifths of all Tennessee residents would pay less tax by switching to an income-tax centered system of taxation. Their current literature suggests that the food tax could be completely repealed, the overall sales tax rate could be lowered to 5.75%, and more revenue still be generated by the state with the implementation of a modest income tax. Opponents argue that there would be no guarantee that the sales tax rates, once lowered, would not soon be raised again.

In addition to its long-term work to modernize Tennessee's tax system, TFT has also worked on other initiatives that fit within its mission. Most recently, TFT has worked to close corporate tax loopholes by enacting combined reporting for business excise tax purposes. The business excise tax in Tennessee is a tax on business profits levied at 6.5% of net earnings. Tennessee currently uses separate reporting, which means each company files a separate tax return, even if that company is just a subsidiary of a larger parent company. This makes Tennessee vulnerable to a host of tax avoidance schemes such as Delaware Holding Companies and Captive REITs. Under combined reporting rules, as is used in 22 states currently, the parent company and all its related subsidiaries file a single, unified tax return, rendering the shifting of profits between affiliates meaningless, and thereby shutting down a host of tax loopholes at once.
