= Bridgeport Music =

US music publishing company

Bridgeport Music is a music publishing company founded in Michigan by Armen Boladian in 1969. It controls the copyrights to recordings by George Clinton and Funkadelic. Bridgeport Music has filed lawsuits for copyright infringement via sampling against hundreds of defendants under the federal copyright statute, 17 U.S.C., leading to them to being often described as a "Sample troll". Among others, Bridgeport has sued for sampling infringements in popular music produced by Public Enemy, N.W.A, Jay-Z and The Notorious B.I.G. - a case in which the jury awarded Bridgeport more than $4 million in damages.

== Notable court cases ==
On May 4, 2001 in Bridgeport Music, Inc. v. 11C Music, 202 F.R.D. 229' (M.D. Tenn 2001), Bridgeport Music filed a lawsuit alleging infringement of its copyrights in several sound recordings and musical compositions through sampling. It was seeking declaratory judgement, injunctive relief, and damages in around 500 different claims against approximately 800 defendants. The court decided that these cases should all be tried separately, which resulted in 477 individual cases. Notable cases include:

- Bridgeport Music, Inc. v. Dimension Films
- Pharrell Williams v. Bridgeport Music
- Bridgeport Music, Inc. v. Smith
- Bridgeport Music, Inc. v. Universal-Mca Music Publishing, Inc.
- Bridgeport Music, Inc. v. Still N the Water Publishing
- Bridgeport Music, Inc. v. Dm Records, Inc.
- Bridgeport Music, Inc. v. Justin Combs Publishing

== See also ==
- Bridgeport Music, Inc. v. Dimension Films
