= De minimis =

Latin phrase: 'about minimal things'

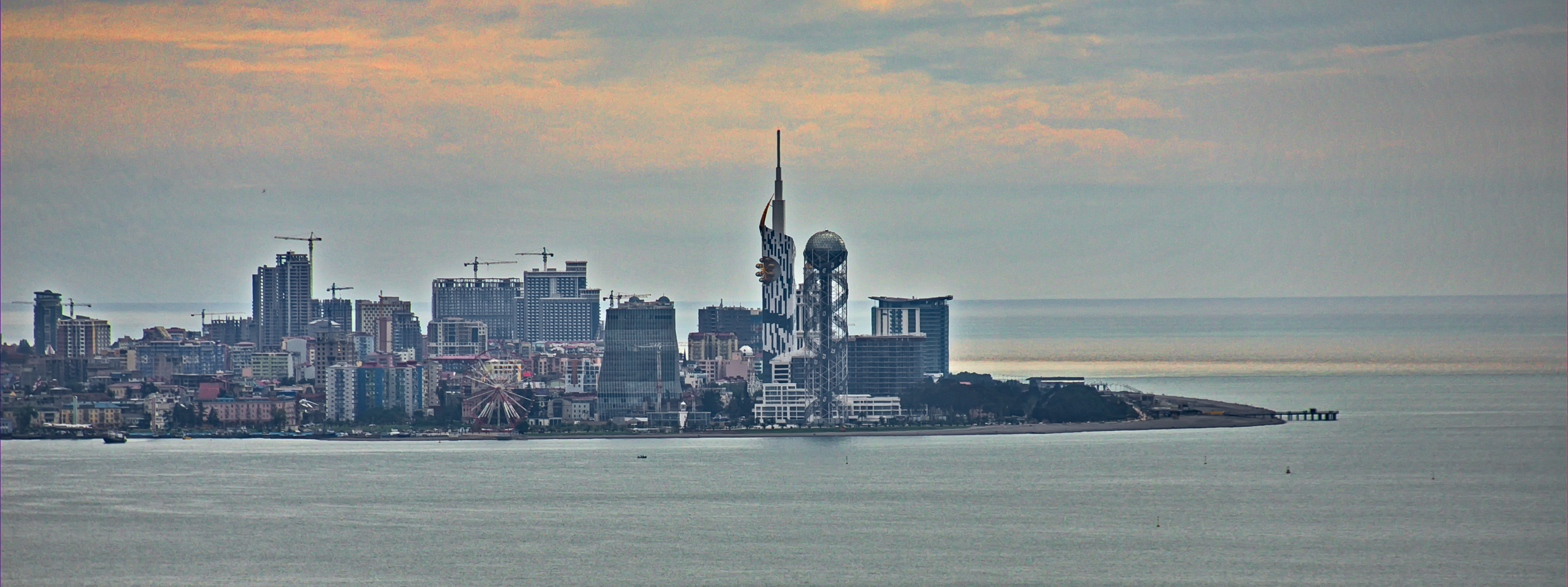
The country of Georgia has no legally recognized freedom of panorama, and a strict interpretation of copyright law makes commercial reproduction of a likeness of any modern Georgian building a likely copyright violation. However, a panorama of a Georgian city (here, Batumi), which does not focus on any building in detail, is probably allowable owing to the de minimis principle.

De minimis is a legal doctrine by which a court refuses to consider trifling matters. The name of the doctrine is a Latin expression meaning "pertaining to minimal things" or "with trifles", normally in the terms de minimis non curat praetor ('the praetor does not concern himself with trifles') or de minimis non curat lex ('the law does not concern itself with trifles'). Queen Christina of Sweden (r. 1633–1654) favoured the similar Latin adage, aquila non capit muscās ('the eagle does not catch flies').

The general term has come to have a variety of specialized meanings in various contexts as shown below, which indicate that beneath a certain low level a quantity is regarded as trivial, and treated commensurately.

== History ==
The legal history of de minimis dates back to the 15th century in the civil law, although there are earlier antecedents. It was incorporated into David Dudley Field's Maxims of Jurisprudence of New York by the 1800s which was later exported by migrants such as John Chilton Burch to newer US states such as California by the 1870s and Montana by the 1890s—as well as to other states such as North Dakota.

== Uses in tax law ==
=== Duties and taxes on imports ===
The de minimis threshold (also de minimis trade rule or de minimis exemption) is the value of a shipment that can be imported without payment of customs duties (import tariffs) or taxes (such as the value-added tax in the EU).

In recent years, countries have been reviewing their tax and duty-free exemptions so as to avoid providing an advantage to low-value imports. For example, the European Union and South Africa have proposed the elimination of duty-free de minimis exemptions. Since 2021, there has been no de minimis exemption for imports from value-added tax in the EU.

==== De minimis trade rule in the United States ====
In the United States, the de minimis import threshold was raised to $800 from $200 per person per day in 2016 to facilitate trade and to save on enforcement costs. The change meant the U.S. had one of the highest de minimis levels in the world. By comparison, in 2024 the duty-free threshold was $673 in Australia, $166 in the EU, and $71 in Japan (measured in U.S. dollars).

In September 2024, the U.S. began taking action following an "exponential" increase in the number of de minimis shipments over the previous decade, from approximately 140 million to over one billion a year. The surge in de minimis shipments was largely attributed to the rise of direct-to-consumer e-commerce platforms, particularly those based in China such as Shein and Temu. According to a congressional report, Shein and Temu paid no import duties in 2022, while brick and mortar rivals H&M and Gap paid $205 million and $700 million, respectively.

New regulations introduced under the Biden administration required additional data (such as the identity of the person claiming the exemption, and the 10-digit tariff classification number) and excluded products subject to tariffs under Sections 201 (mostly solar panels), 232 (steel and aluminum), and 301 (includes textiles, apparel and footwear) from de minimis treatment. Section 301 tariffs covered approximately 70% of textile and apparel imports from China and the U.S. believed the changes would greatly reduce shipments.

As part of a policy of increasing tariffs in the second Trump administration, President Donald Trump acted to close the de minimis exemption. In April 2025, Trump signed Executive Order 14256 to end the de minimis exemption for all products from China on May 2. Congress passed a bill to end the exemption for all countries on July 1, 2027. On July 30, 2025, Trump signed another order moving forward the closure to August 29, 2025, in order "to deal with national emergencies and save American lives and businesses now".

=== Australia ===
In Australia donations to charities are tax deductible if they equal or exceed two dollars. The amount hasn't changed since decimal currency replaced pounds, shillings and pence in 1966. Inflation has since rendered this amount trivial.

=== European Union ===
According to European Union regulations, de minimis "state aid" is any amount of aid up to the de minimis ceiling of €300,000 provided from state funds to a business enterprise over a rolling three-year period. For businesses in the land transport sector, the de minimis ceiling is €100,000. If a business receives more than the de minimis ceiling amount of aid, it is subject to a different set of regulations.

Under European Union competition law, some agreements infringing Article 101(1) of the Treaty on the Functioning of the European Union (formerly Article 81(1) of the EC Treaty) are considered to be de minimis and therefore accepted. Horizontal agreement, that is one between competitors, will usually be de minimis where the parties' market share is 10% or less, and a vertical agreement, between undertakings operating at different levels of the market, where it is 15% or less.

Procurement of low value contracts is subject to limited regulation when their value falls below certain low thresholds.

=== United States ===
Under U.S. tax rules, the de minimis rule governs the treatment of small amounts of market discount. Under the rule, if a bond is purchased with a small amount of market discount (an amount less than 0.25% of the face value of a bond times the number of complete years between the bond's acquisition date and its maturity date) the market discount is considered to be zero and the discount on the bond will be considered to be a capital gain upon the bond's disposition or redemption rather than ordinary income. Under Internal Revenue Service guidelines, the de minimis rule can also apply to any benefit, property, or service provided to an employee that has so little value that reporting for it would be unreasonable or administratively impracticable; for example, use of a company photocopier to copy personal documents – see de minimis fringe benefit. Cash is not excludable, regardless of the amount.

Specifically in U.S. state income tax, de minimis refers to the point at which withholdings should be initiated for a nonresident working in a state that taxes personal income. Not all U.S. states levy income taxes, and there is little consistency among nonresident de minimis standards for those that do. Some states base de minimis on the number of days worked (although the definition of what counts as a workday has been controversial), others on the dollars earned or a percentage of total income derived from work in the state, and still others use a combination of methods. These inconsistencies have led to repeated attempts to pass the Mobile Workforce State Income Tax Simplification Act without success.

== Other uses ==
=== Agriculture ===
Under the de minimis provision of the World Trade Organization's Agreement on Agriculture there is no requirement to cap trade-distorting domestic support in any year during which the value of support does not exceed a certain percentage (5–10%) of the national production value per product or of all products taken together if the support is not attributable to any specific product category.

=== Christian theology ===
The principle of de minimis non curat lex has been commonly used in defence of the historical reliability of the Gospels. F. W. Upham used the term when speaking of "the [...] minor differences that make up the larger part of the current argument against the Gospels." Simon Greenleaf's Testimony of the Evangelists is perhaps the most famous application of legal rules to the Christian Gospels.

=== Copyright ===
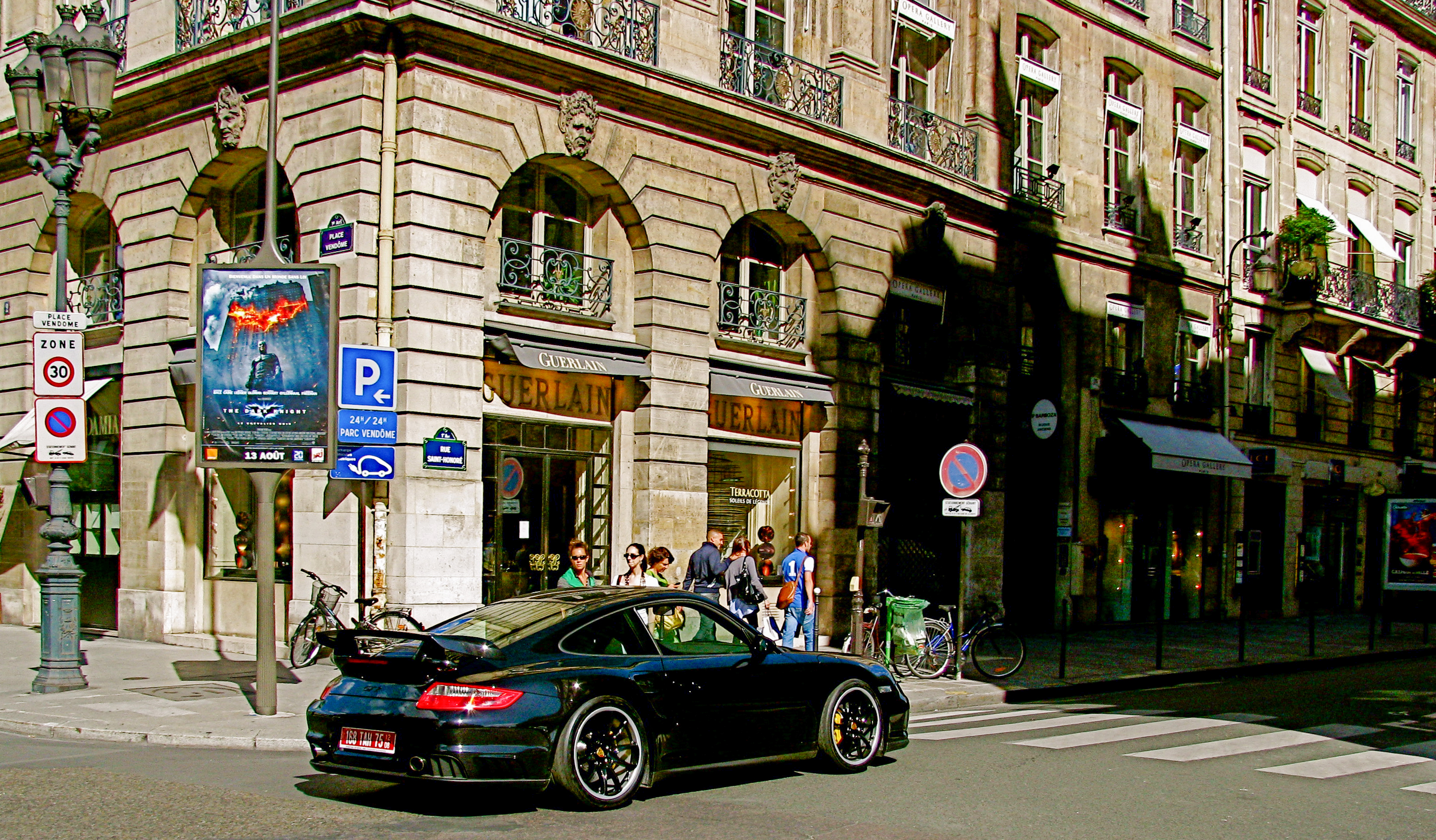
A photo of an intersection in France. The Dark Knight movie poster on the image is too insignificant to constitute copyright infringement.

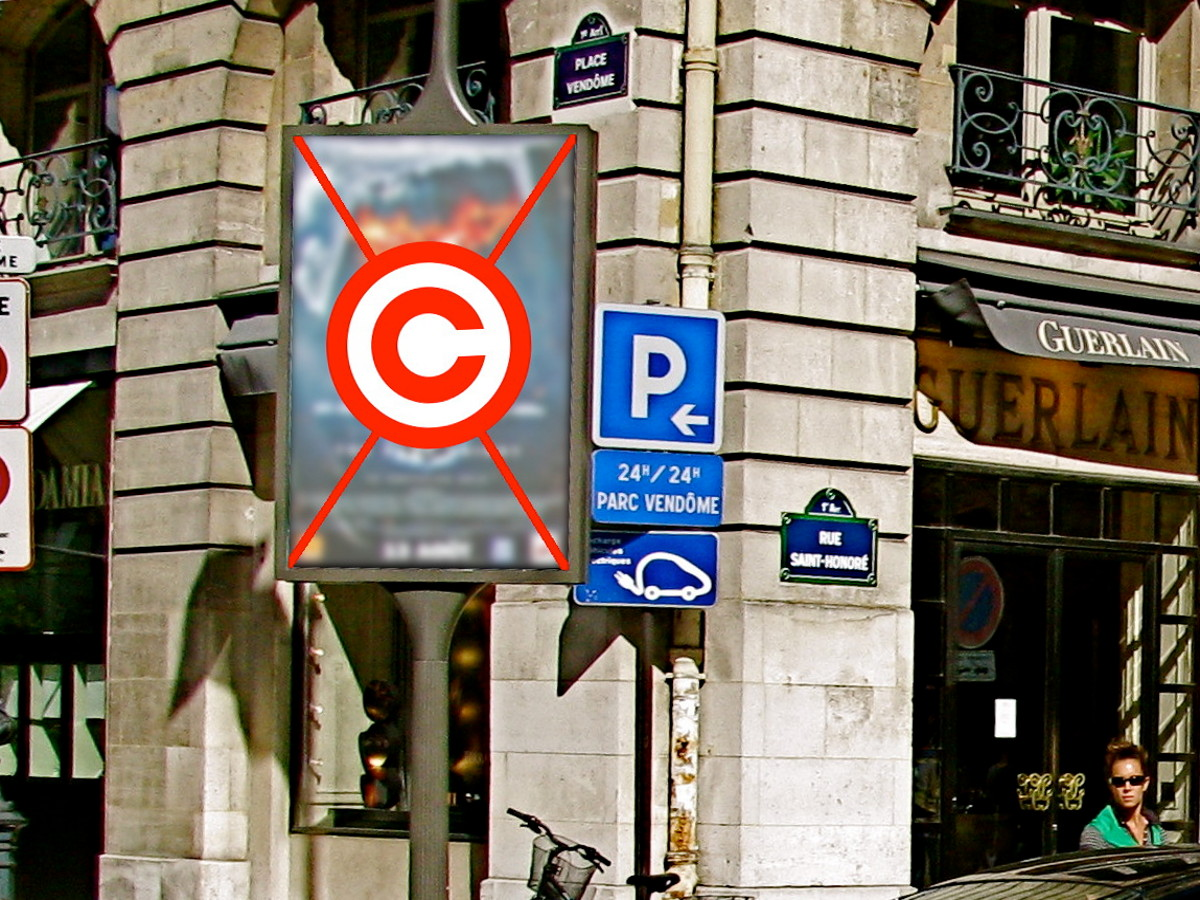
A crop of the image that focuses on the poster may be considered a copyright violation, hence it has been censored in this image.

Courts will occasionally not uphold a claim to copyright on modified public domain material if the changes are deemed to be de minimis. Similarly, courts have dismissed copyright infringement cases on the grounds that the alleged infringer's use of the copyrighted work (such as sampling) was so insignificant as to be de minimis. For example, the NBA 2K video games that included copyrighted tattoos in the recreation of the players' likenesses were found to be in de minimis and not copyright-violating. However, in Bridgeport Music, Inc. v. Dimension Films, such a ruling was overturned on appeal, the US appeals court explicitly declining to recognize a de minimis standard for digital sampling. De minimis was also invoked in the James Newton v. Beastie Boys copyright infringement lawsuit, where a 6-second sample of Newton's piece Choir was used in Pass the Mic; Newton lost the case.

==== India ====
The principle of de minimis non curat lex can be used as a defense in India in cases of copyright infringement. The important issue is whether the de minimis principle could be used as a separate defence from fair use under section 52 of the Indian Copyright Act. In India TV Independent News Service Pvt. Ltd. and Ors. v Yashraj Films Pvt. Ltd., the court discussed the applicability of de minimis principle at length. Before this case the position was not very clear concerning the applicability. The facts of the case were that five words were copied from a song of five stanzas. After applying the five well-known factors commonly considered by courts in applying de minimis, the court reached the conclusion that the infraction is trivial and attracts the defence of de minimis.

=== Criminology and crime ===
In criminology, the de minimis or minimalist approach is an addition to a general harm principle. The general harm principle fails to consider the possibility of other sanctions to prevent harm, and the effectiveness of criminalization as a chosen option. Those other sanctions include civil courts, laws of tort and regulation. Having criminal remedies in place is seen as a "last resort" since such actions often infringe personal liberties – incarceration, for example, prevents the freedom of movement. In this sense, law making that places a greater emphasis on human rights, such as the European Convention on Human Rights, falls into the de minimis category. Most crimes of direct action (murder, rape, assault, for example) are generally not affected by such a stance, but do require greater justification in less clear cases.

The de minimis rule in North American drug law requires a usable quantity of the substance in question before charges can be brought, known as the minority rule.

In Canada, de minimis is often used as a standard of whether a criminal offence is made out at a preliminary stage. For a charge of second degree murder, the test being: "could the jury reasonably conclude that accused actions were a contributing cause, beyond de minimis, of the victim's death".

=== Education ===
In Endrew v. Douglas County School District, the U.S. Supreme Court unanimously ruled, on March 22, 2017, that the Individuals with Disabilities Education Act (IDEA) requires more than de minimis efforts to provide equivalent educational opportunity to students with disabilities. The decision reversed a previous decision by the U.S. Court of Appeals for the Tenth Circuit.

=== Planning ===
In environmental planning in New Zealand, the use of the term de minimis is common in the legal and planning professions. While not defined under the Resource Management Act 1991, it is commonly used in case law concerning an assessment of environmental effect, e.g. "the potential adverse effect of one additional road user on the crossing is considered to be de minimis." It is used when an actual or potential effect may exist, but is so minor that it is close to negligible or zero in nature.

=== Risk assessment ===
In risk assessment, it refers to the highest level of risk that is still too small to be of concern. Therefore, only risk levels above this de minimis level must be addressed and managed. Some refer to this as a "virtually safe" level. It has applications in the fields of auditing, modeling, and engineering, and may refer to situations of low (negligible) risk. It can be verified in ASA 1.

=== Transportation ===
Following bus deregulation in Great Britain in 1986, small contracts for supplementary local bus services could be let by local authorities without competitive tendering. The Department for Transport's "Guidance on New De Minimis Rules for Bus Subsidy Contracts" (2005) notes that "The Transport Act 1985 (as amended by the Transport Act 2000) introduced the provisions which govern the duties of local passenger transport authorities to secure local bus services where these would not otherwise be met. In the majority of cases these services have to be secured through competitive tender. The Service Subsidy Agreements (Tendering) Regulations provided local authorities with the scope to let any individual bus subsidy contract in any one year up to a certain maximum value without the need to competitively tender (the de minimis limits). There was also a maximum value that de minimis contracts could be let with any one operator in any one year."

== See also ==
- List of Latin phrases
- Small claims court
- Sugar bowl (legal maxim)
