= Gift tax in the United States =

Tax imposed on the transfer of ownership of property during the giver's life

A gift tax, known originally as inheritance tax, is a tax imposed on the transfer of ownership of property during the giver's life. The United States Internal Revenue Service says that a gift is "Any transfer to an individual, either directly or indirectly, where full compensation (measured in money or money's worth) is not received in return".

When a taxable gift in the form of cash, stocks, real estate, gift cards, or other tangible or intangible property is made, the tax is usually imposed on the donor (the giver) unless there is a retention of an interest which delays completion of the gift. A transfer is "completely gratuitous" when the donor receives nothing of value in exchange for the given property. A transfer is "gratuitous in part" when the donor receives some value, but the value of the property received by the donor is substantially less than the value of the property given by the donor. In this case, the amount of the gift is the difference.

In the United States, the gift tax is governed by Chapter 12, Subtitle B of the Internal Revenue Code. The tax is imposed by section 2501 of the Code. For taxable income, courts have defined a "gift" as the proceeds from a "detached and disinterested generosity". Gifts are often given out of "affection, respect, admiration, charity or like impulses".

Generally, if an interest in a property is transferred during the giver's lifetime (often called an inter vivos gift), then the gift or transfer would not be subject to the estate tax. In 1976, Congress unified the gift and estate tax regimes, limiting the giver's ability to circumvent the estate tax by giving during their lifetime. Some differences between estate and gift taxes remain, such as the effective tax rate, the amount of the credit available against tax, and the basis of the received property.

There are also types of gifts that will be included in a person's estate, such as certain gifts made within the three-year window before death and gifts in which the donor retains an interest, such as gifts of remainder interests that are not either qualified remainder trusts or charitable remainder trusts. The remainder interest gift tax rules impose the tax on the transfer of the entire value of the trust by assigning a zero value to the interest retained by the donor.

== Non-taxable gifts ==
Generally, the following gifts are not taxable:

- Gifts that are not more than the annual exclusion for the calendar year (last raised to $19,000 per recipient for any one donor, beginning in 2025; see table below)
- Gifts to a political organization for its use
- Gifts to charities
- Gifts to one's (US Citizen) spouse
- Tuition or medical expenses one pays directly to a medical or educational institution for someone. Donors must pay the expense directly. If the donor writes a check to donee and donee then pays the expense, the gift may be subject to tax.

== Exemptions ==
There are two levels of exemption from the gift tax.

First, gifts up to the annual exclusion incur no tax or filing requirement.

Annual Exclusion per Donee for Year of Gift
Year of Gift	Annual Exclusion per Donee
1981 through 2001	$10,000
2002 through 2005	$11,000
2006 through 2008	$12,000
2009 through 2012	$13,000
2013 through 2017	$14,000
2018 through 2021	$15,000
2022	$16,000
2023	$17,000
2024	$18,000
2025	$19,000

By splitting their gifts, married couples can give up to twice this amount tax-free. Each giver and recipient pair has its own annual exclusion; a giver can give to any number of recipients, and the exclusion is not affected by other gifts that the recipient may have received from other givers.

Second, gifts over the annual exclusion may still be tax-free up to the lifetime estate basic exclusion amount ($13.99 million for 2025). However, such gifts might increase estate taxes for estates over that amount. Taxpayers who expect to have a taxable estate may sometimes prefer to pay gift taxes as they occur rather than saving them up as part of the estate.

Furthermore, transfers (whether by bequest, gift, or inheritance) above $1 million may be subject to a generation-skipping transfer tax if specific other criteria are met.

== Non-residents ==
For gift tax purposes, the test is different in determining who is a non-resident alien compared to the one for income tax purposes (the inquiry centers around the decedent's domicile). This is a subjective test that looks primarily at intent. The test considers factors such as the length of stay in the United States; frequency of travel, size, and cost of home in the United States; location of family; participation in community activities; participation in U.S. business and ownership of assets in the United States; and voting. A foreign citizen can be considered a U.S. resident for income tax purposes but not gift tax purposes.

If a person is a non-resident alien for purposes of gift tax, taxation of gifts is determined differently. There is no gift tax if the property is not located in the U.S. There is no gift tax if it is intangible property, such as shares in U.S. corporations and interests in partnerships or LLCs.

Non-resident alien donors are allowed the same annual gift tax exclusion as other taxpayers ($14,000 per year for 2013 through 2016). Non-resident alien donors do not have a lifetime unified credit. Non-resident alien donors are subject to the same rate schedule for gift taxes.

U.S. citizens and residents must report gifts from a non-resident alien that are more than $100,000 on Form 3520.

=== Noncitizen spouse ===
According to 26 USC section 2523(i), gifts to a non-U.S.-citizen spouse are not generally exempt from gift tax. Instead, they are exempt only up to a specified amount foreseen by 26 USC section 2503 (b) (that is, up to $159,000 for 2021).

== U.S. Federal gift tax contrasted with U.S. Federal income tax treatment of gifts ==
Under 26 U.S.C. § 102, the receipt of a gift, bequest, devise, or inheritance is not included in gross income. Thus, a taxpayer does not include the value of the gift when filing an income tax return. Although many items might appear to be gifts, courts have held that the transferor's intent is the most critical factor. The transferor must demonstrate a "detached and disinterested generosity" when giving the gift to exclude the value of the gift from the taxpayer's gross income. The courts have defined "gift" as proceeds from a "detached and disinterested generosity".

"Gifts" received from employers that benefit employees are not excluded from taxation. 26 U.S.C. § 102(c) clearly states employers cannot exclude as a gift anything transferred to an employee that benefits the employee. Consequently, an employer cannot "gift" an employee's salary to avoid taxation.

Gifts from certain parties will always be taxed for U.S. Federal income tax purposes. Under Internal Revenue Code section 102(c), gifts transferred by or for an employer to, or for the benefit of, an employee cannot be excluded from the employee's gross income for federal income tax purposes. While there are some statutory exemptions under this rule for de minimis fringe amounts and achievement awards, the general rule is the employee must report a "gift" from the employer as income for Federal income tax purposes. The foundation for the preceding rule is the presumption that employers do not give employees items of value out of "detached and disinterested generosity" due to the existing employment relationship.

Under Internal Revenue Code section 102(b)(1), income subsequently derived from any property received as a gift is not excludable from the income taxed to the recipient. In addition, under Internal Revenue Code section 102(b)(2), a donor may not circumvent this requirement by giving only the income and not the property itself to the recipient. Thus, a gift of income is always income to the recipient. Permitting such an exclusion would allow the donor and the recipient to avoid paying taxes on the income received, a loophole Congress has chosen to eliminate.

== History ==
The gift tax is a backstop to the United States estate tax. Without the gift tax, large estates could be reduced by simply giving the money away before death, thus escaping any potential estate tax. Gifts above the annual exemption amount act to reduce the lifetime gift tax exclusion. Congress initially passed the gift tax in 1932 at a much lower rate than the estate tax, a full 25% under the estate tax rate, while also providing a $50,000 exemption, separate from the $50,000 exemption under estate tax. The benefits were clear: a $10,000,000 gift would be taxed only $2,300,000, effectively only 23.0%, well below the estate tax rate.

The intention was to rapidly generate revenue in the Great Depression, effectively encouraging avoidance of the estate tax by doing so, while lawmakers at the same time publicly, and in both House and Senate, proclaimed the exact opposite objective. Moreover, this was directly at the expense of state tax revenues and future federal tax revenues. The primary beneficiaries were the wealthiest citizens, whom the estate tax was supposedly designed to target since only they had enough money to make large gifts freely. This was the express intention.

== See also ==
- GRAT
- SOGRAT
- Uniform Gifts to Minors Act
- Crummey trust
