= Hall income tax =

Tax in interest, dividend, and investment income in Tennessee, United States

The Hall income tax was a Tennessee state tax on interest and dividend income from investments. It was the only tax on personal income in Tennessee, which did not levy a general state income tax. The tax rate prior to 2016 was 6 percent, applied to all taxable interest and dividend income over $1250 per person ($2500 for married couples filing jointly). Revenues were shared with the government of the municipality or county where the taxpayer resided.

Between 2016 and 2020, the state reduced the Hall income tax by one percentage point each year, leading to a full repeal of the tax in 2021. As of January 1, 2021 the Hall income tax no longer exists and the state does not levy a personal income tax of any form on individuals.

== History ==
The Hall tax is named for Frank S. Hall, who introduced the bill in the Tennessee State Senate in 1929. The bill was enacted and became Chapter 86, Public Acts of 1929. Authority for the tax derives from the 1870 amendments to the Tennessee State Constitution, which gave the General Assembly the power "to levy a tax on incomes derived from stocks and bonds that are not taxed ad valorem." In 2004, an analysis suggested that this provision of the state constitution had been intended to address difficulties that Tennessee government had experienced in its efforts to apply property tax to intangible forms of property. An opinion of the Tennessee Supreme Court in 1929, issued in the case of Shields v. Williams and written by Chief Justice Grafton Green, found that the Hall tax was a privilege tax, not a property tax. Therefore the Hall tax was not subject to a provision of the state constitution requiring all property to be taxed uniformly.

At first, the tax rate was 5%, and all revenue collected by the state government was retained by the state government. In 1931, the General Assembly amended the law to distribute 45% of the revenue to local governments. This had the effect of allocating 2.75 percentage points of the taxable income to the state government and 2.25 points to local government. In 1937, the tax rate was increased to 6% and the portion allocated to local governments was reduced to three-eighths of the total, thus keeping the local governments' share at 2.25 percentage points of the taxable income reported by their residents. This allocation remains in effect.

In 2002, the Tennessee Department of Revenue established an electronic system for filing tax returns and ceased mailing tax forms to taxpayers believed to be subject to the tax.

In 2016, the state reduced the Hall income tax to 5% with intention to eliminate it completely. On April 26, 2017, Governor Haslam signed into law a reduction in the tax rate each year between 2017 and 2020 and a full repeal of the tax in 2021.

- 4% for tax years beginning January 1, 2017, and prior to January 1, 2018
- 3% for tax years beginning January 1, 2018, and prior to January 1, 2019
- 2% for tax years beginning January 1, 2019, and prior to January 1, 2020
- 1% for tax years beginning January 1, 2020, and prior to January 1, 2021
- Full repeal for tax years beginning January 1, 2021

== Applicability ==
The Hall tax applied to interest and dividend income received by people who maintain their legal residence in Tennessee, including part-year residents who live in the state for at least six months of the year.

Dividends subject to the tax were dividends from corporations, investment trusts, and mutual funds, including capital gains distributions from mutual funds. Taxable forms of interest include interest on bonds issued by persons, corporations, churches, joint stock companies, business trusts, U.S. states and local political subdivisions outside Tennessee, and foreign governments; and interest on mortgages, commercial paper, and other written obligations that mature more than six months after the date of issue. The tax did not apply to income from government obligations issued by the U.S. federal government and Tennessee state or local governments. Dividends from stock in banks and similar institutions (but not bank holding companies), as well as several types of Tennessee business, were exempt from the tax. Interest paid on bank and credit union accounts also is not subject to the Hall tax, regardless of the location of the bank.

The first $1,250 of a person's interest and dividend income that would otherwise be subject to the Hall tax was exempt from taxation. Married couples may file joint returns, in which case $2,500 of the couple's joint taxable interest and dividend income is exempt. Blind people and people over 65 years old whose total annual income is $33,000 or less ($59,000 for joint filers) were not subject to the Hall income tax. Some interest and dividend income received by a person who is a quadriplegic was exempt from the tax.

Evasion of the Hall income tax could have been prosecuted as a Class E felony, with penalties of up to two years in state prison and up to $3,000 in fines. The Tennessee Department of Revenue used Internal Revenue Service data to assist in identifying taxable income that was not being reported.

== Revenues collected ==
Prior to the phased repeal, Hall income tax accounted for about 2% of Tennessee's state tax collections. Revenue from the Hall tax peaked at $289.7 million during Tennessee's fiscal year 2008, when almost 192,000 households paid Hall income tax, based on returns filed for calendar year 2007. Hall income tax collections totaled $213.9 million and $172 million for calendar years 2008 and 2009, respectively (paid in Tennessee's fiscal year 2009 and fiscal year 2010). About 156,000 state households paid the tax in fiscal year 2009 for income received in 2008.

Revenue from the Hall income tax varied significantly from year to year, making it difficult for governments to predict. Some of the largest year-to-year changes occurred in FY 1998, when collections increased 25.5% from the previous year, and FYs 2002 and 2009, when collections dropped 26.1% from the previous years. A principal reason for the large variability in revenues is the application of the tax to capital gains distributions from mutual funds. A 2004 report by the Tennessee Advisory Commission on Intergovernmental Relations observed that capital gains from investments had displayed "roller-coaster behavior" over the preceding eight years. The Tennessee Advisory Commission on Intergovernmental Relations identified this variability, coupled with increased investor participation in mutual funds, as the main cause of fluctuations in Hall tax collections during the same period.

== Distributions to municipalities and counties ==
Three-eighths of Hall income tax payments were distributed to the local government of the municipality or county where the taxpayer resided. There were no restrictions on how local governments use the money. This distribution arrangement may be related to the genesis of the Hall tax as a property tax on an intangible property.

Distributions to municipalities were generally larger than distributions to counties. In FY 2003, combined distributions to all of the state's municipalities totaled $42,332,061, or an average of $13.22 per municipal resident, while distributions to counties were $8,184,443, an average of only $3.30 for each resident living outside city limits. In FY 2003, the largest per capita recipient of Hall income tax distributions was Belle Meade, a wealthy enclave in Metropolitan Nashville-Davidson County, which received a per capita distribution of $491.68. At the low end, 14 municipalities had no income from the Hall tax. Per capita distributions to counties ranged from a high of $15.41 to Williamson County to a low of $0.40 to Hancock County.

Although the Hall income tax was a relatively minor source of revenue for most local governments, it was a major source of funds for a few small municipalities, particularly those with wealthy residents. prior to repeal, the government of the City of Belle Meade received over one-third of its revenue from the Hall income tax. Other Tennessee municipalities identified as highly dependent on the tax, based on 1997 data, were Forest Hills, Allardt, Lookout Mountain, Slayden, and Walden.

In FY 2010, combined payments to Knox County and its included municipalities (including Knoxville) totaled $12.5 million, the highest of any county in the state. Shelby County and its municipalities (including Memphis) received a total of $11.4 million, while Davidson County and its municipalities (including Nashville) received a total of $10.4 million. Other counties where combined payments to the county and municipalities exceeded $1 million were Hamilton County ($5 million), Williamson County ($4.5 million), Sullivan County ($1.4 million), and Sumner County ($1.3 million). At the low end, Hancock County and its municipalities received a total of $2,755.

== Criticisms and proposals for changes ==
The Hall income tax was the subject of chronic criticism, primarily for being regressive and for having a negative impact on retired people. The IMPROVE Act, enacted in 2017 to phase out the tax, is the latest in a long line of legislative proposals that would have eliminated it, replacing it with a general personal income tax, or changing its rates or exemptions. In the late 1990s and early 2000s, there were bills to raise state government revenue by reducing the fraction of the Hall tax that is distributed to local governments.

The proposals for major changes to the Hall tax failed because of the lack of alternative sources of revenue. The Hall tax was Tennessee's only tax on personal income; the state does not levy a general personal income tax.

In 1932 and 1960, the Tennessee Supreme Court rejected proposals for a general personal income tax. Through 1974, the Tennessee Supreme Court had consistently held that the state constitution authorized only three types of taxes: privilege taxes, ad valorem property taxes, and a tax on income from interest and dividends. In 1981, 1991, and 1999, three different Tennessee Attorneys General issued opinions that a general income tax would not violate the state constitution. However, in 2014, the state constitution was amended to explicitly prohibit a tax on earned income.

In December 2004, a Tennessee Tax Structure Study Commission said the Hall income tax was regressive, anti-competitive, and "unfairly selective". Its final report called the tax "particularly harmful to retirees with limited income derived mainly from investments", noting that low-income retirees with dividend and interest income pay the tax, but low-income people with income from other sources do not. The report also said the tax "encourages retirees to leave the State". The commission recommended repealing the tax, reducing or repealing certain other state taxes, and enacting a general personal income tax in their place.

On the other hand, the Institute on Taxation and Economic Policy said the tax is actually the only major progressive tax levied in Tennessee—amounting to 0.4 percent of income for high-income taxpayers compared to 0.0–0.1 percent for less affluent Tennesseans.

Other critics suggested that the tax discouraged people from saving and hindered efforts to encourage retirees to settle in Tennessee. Organizations including the League of Women Voters of Tennessee and Tennesseans for Fair Taxation endorsed the repeal of the Hall income tax as part of comprehensive tax reform that includes a broad-based personal income tax.

The Tennessee Center for Policy Research, in a "Legislator's Guide to the Issues" published in 2009 and 2011, called the 6-percent rate "sizeable" and said the tax "makes Tennessee an unwelcoming place, particularly for retirees and the wealthy". It advocated repealing the tax "to encourage wealthy and retired individuals to move to Tennessee" and cutting state spending to offset the lost revenue.

In the 2011 General Assembly, eight bills were introduced to reduce or eliminate the Hall tax, including a total phase-out comparable to the one enacted in 2017. The only one that passed was a measure to increase the income exemptions for persons over 65 by $10,000, to $26,200 for individual taxpayers and $37,000 for joint filers. It made about 4,725 taxpayers eligible for the tax exemption, reducing revenue by about $1.65 million, including $1 million for the state and $650,000 for local governments. Governor Bill Haslam had earlier endorsed this proposal, saying: "If you're retired and living on dividends, I'm not sure why you should be treated so much different from someone who's living on a salary."

== See also ==
- State income tax
