= Frank S. Hall (Tennessee politician) =

American politician

- Born: 1890
- Died: 1958 (aged 67–68)
- Occupation: Politician
- Political party: Democratic Party

Frank S. Hall (1890–1958) was an American politician. He served as the Democratic Speaker of the Tennessee House of Representatives from 1923 to 1925. In 1929, he sponsored the Hall income tax, which passed into law.
