= VMG Salsoul v. Ciccone =

2016 court case about music sampling

VMG Salsoul v Ciccone 824 F.3d 871 (9th Cir. 2016) is a court case that has played an important role in redefining the legal status of sampling in music under American copyright law. The case involved a claim of copyright infringement brought forth against the pop star Madonna, for sampling the horns from an early 1980s song "Ooh I Love It (Love Break)" by the Salsoul Orchestra in her international hit song "Vogue". Such sampling was done without a license, or compensation to VMG Salsoul, LLC, which was the copyright holder of "Love Break" and therefore brought suit claiming infringement and damages. The Ninth Circuit was to rule upon a contentious issue in the music industry at large, i.e. whether the de minimis defense is applicable against a claim of copyright infringement in the case of sound recording, with special regard to the practice of sampling.

The issue was brought before a federal judge, with the plaintiff claiming that both a single horn hit and a double horn hit had been copied from their work without license. However, the federal court ruled in favor of the defendants, accepting their defense under the de minimis doctrine, wherein they said only a minimal and insubstantial part of the original work had been copied in the new work. Subsequently, the U.S. Court of Appeals for the 9th Circuit affirmed the federal court's decision and reinstated the de minimis defense in the case of sound recordings. This defense had effectively been eliminated by the judgement given in Bridgeport Music, Inc. v. Dimension Films by the U.S. Court of Appeals for the 6th Circuit which established a bright-line licensing regime with regards to samples which held that license must be taken regardless of duration or substantiality of sample. The Court of Appeals for the 9th Circuit also relied on the decision given by the same court in Newton v. Diamond, 388 F.3d 1189, 1190 (9th Cir. 2003) which held de minimis as a valid defense in claims of infringement in sound recordings and to determine whether use was de minimis it must be considered whether an average audience would recognize appropriation from the original work as present in the accused work.

== The court's decision ==
=== Majority opinion ===
In its summary review of the federal court judgement, the Ninth Circuit gave its decision on the assumption that copying of the horn hit had been done as the Plaintiff had submitted sufficient evidence, including anecdotal evidence, to necessitate this inference. However, this was not enough to conclusively prove infringement had occurred as the Court required evidence that such copying was 'substantial' in nature. Therefore, in the majority decision favoring the Defendants the Ninth Circuit held that:

1. The horn hit used in Vogue was insubstantial enough so as to be considered de minimis
2. The de minimis doctrine is a valid defense to claims of copyright infringement in the case of sound recordings and has not been eliminated by Congress as held in the Bridgeport Music Case.

In considering whether the sample of the horn hit used was substantial or not, the Ninth Circuit used the facts of Newton as reference. In that case, the Beastie Boys used a six-second sample from the original work and looped it throughout the entirety of their new work, the single "Pass the Mic", with the sample appearing over forty times in their rendition of the song. Despite this the Ninth Circuit in its judgement rejected the claims of infringement on the grounds that an average audience would not be able to "discern the role played by the plaintiff in the new song as the hand of a composer", and held such usage insubstantial. On the other hand, in this case, the duration of the sample used is no more than 0.23 seconds, and only appears intermittently throughout the song rather than serving as the bedrock of the composition. Therefore, it is only logical that the sample of the horn hit be held as insubstantial in this case too as it is of lesser duration, frequency and prominence in the new work vis-a-vis the fact scenario in Newton where it was held to be insubstantial and meeting the criteria of a de minimis defense too.

The Ninth Circuit also gave its reason for going against the holding of the Bridgeport Music Case, and why it found the rationale behind its holding unpersuasive. It stated that the Sixth Circuit's reasoning for stating that the de minimis defense has been eliminated by Congress is based on a faulty interpretation of a portion of 17 U.S.C. § 114 which states,

The exclusive rights of the owner of copyright in a sound recording under clauses (1) and (2) of section 106 do not extend to the making or duplication of another sound recording that consists entirely of an independent fixation of other sounds, even though such sounds imitate or simulate those in the copyrighted sound recording.

The Ninth Circuit noted that the purpose of this provision is to limit the rights of the copyright holder, as it promotes creativity by allowing new artists the right to interpolation, rather than expand it, as has been the result of the Sixth Circuits interpretation. It also points out that this provision states that mimicking of the sound in a new and original recording is allowed by this provision, even if it is very well done, but nowhere does it speak of eliminating the de minimis defense in the case of sound recordings as has been the inference drawn by the Sixth Circuit. To further reinforce their argument that the provision seeks to restrict the rights of the copyright holder rather than the other way around, the Ninth Circuit in its judgement also cited the legislative history of the provision where Congress itself states that that "rights granted (to copyright holder) in 17 U.S.C. § 106 are subject to sections 107 through 118 and must be read in conjunction to those provisions", which are meant to 'provide various limitations, qualifications, or exemptions (to rights granted in section 106).' Also, specifically with respect to 17 U.S.C. § 114(b) the Court cited a House Report which when discussing the provision stated that "infringement (would only) take place whenever all or any substantial portion of the actual sounds that go to make up a copyrighted sound recording are reproduced......"; by stating that substantiality of sounds reproduced is a factor to be considered when determining claims of infringement it clarified that a de minimis defense exists even in the case of sound recordings.

Once these arguments forwarded by the Bridgeport Music Case are set aside, all that remains is that the new artist used expressive contents from the original artist, but this stands true in various artforms and ventures (e.g. creation of picture collages, usage of small portions of old works as quotes in an analytical piece) where the de minimis defense continues to be applicable.

Finally, the Ninth Circuit Court stated that the lack of legislative action in the aftermath of a judicial statutory interpretation is not indicative of legislative assent of such interpretation and such holds true even in the case of an interpretation by the Supreme Court which affects the laws of the entire nation. Thus, congressional inaction in the aftermath of a decision taken by a single Circuit Court is of even lesser weight and must not be a factor to be considered in the final ruling. Therefore, the Court is justified in ignoring the ruling of the Sixth Circuit in the Bridgeport Music case and holding that the de minimis defense exists even in the realm of sound recordings according to which the defendant is not guilty of copyright infringement.

=== Dissenting opinion ===
In the minority opinion delivered by Silverman J., the judge stated that the Bridgeport decision had governed the music industry for over a decade without 'having the sky fall in' or necessitating Congressional intervention. Moreover, he stated that the reasoning provided in the decision in that case was legally sound as can be gleaned from a joint reading of 17 U.S.C. §§ 106 and 114 which state that the original artist has 'the exclusive right to prepare derivative works in which the actual sounds fixed in the sound recording are rearranged, remixed, or otherwise altered in sequence or quality.', whereas the de minimis defense cannot be found anywhere in the statute. He also reiterated the Sixth Circuits characterization in Bridgeport of sampling as stealing, misappropriation and an act of 'physical taking rather than an intellectual one', and therefore inherently infringing in nature. Finally, the judge stated that the bright line licensing rule is easy and efficient to interpret while the introduction of a 'de minimis' inquiry by the majority shall is 'fuzzy' and 'visceral' and shall only add to the burden of the dockets of copyright courts across the United States. Thus, he stated that he dissents from the majority decision.

== Significance and consequences of the ruling ==
In holding that the de minimis defense applies even in the case of sound recordings, the Ninth Circuit has given a great boost to artforms where sampling is used as a form of creative expression, most prominently among them being hip-hop. Sampling was ubiquitous and a widespread practice in the hip-hop industry before the twin blows delivered to unlicensed sampling, regardless of duration, nature or substantiality by the decisions in Grand Upright Music Ltd. v. Warner Bros. Records, Inc. and the Bridgeport Music case. Despite this, hip-hop has grown to be the dominant genre in the musical industry, and this decision may have a great role in further boosting its growth. As much of the hip-hop industry is located in the regions which are bound by the decisions of the Ninth Circuit, it is to be seen whether this gives impetus to creativity in sampling in the industry and effectively balances the public rights of artists who seek to easily access resources to create new works, and private rights of copyright holders who believe they should be compensated for substantial, or prominent use of their intellectual property in the creation of new art.

The decision is also of great significance, as this is one of the first major judgements after Bridgeport Music which expressly rejects its holding of bright line licensing according to which a license is necessary whenever sampling was done, regardless of the duration or how substantial the sample was. This has only added to the growing instances of opposition to the Bridgeport Music ruling by courts which are not bound by its decision. However, this is the first instance of another circuit court rejecting the reasoning given by the Sixth Circuit in the Bridgeport Music case. This opposition to a judgement given by a Circuit Court by another Circuit Court of a different region implies that copyright law shall be implemented in a different manner in different regions of the United States, which is not a decision to be taken lightly. This is called a circuit split. Finally, concerns have also been voiced that allowing this matter in court for an alleged infringement that occurred almost twenty years ago would flood the copyright dockets in the absence of a clear statute of limitations for actions of copyright infringement.
