= Bridgeport Music, Inc. v. Dimension Films =

2005 court case about music sampling

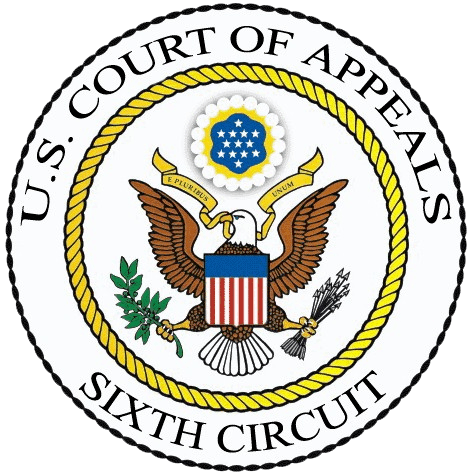
- Court: United States Court of Appeals for the Sixth Circuit
- Full case name: Bridgeport Music, Inc., et al. v. Dimension Films, et al.
- Decided: June 3, 2005
- Citation: 410 F.3d 792

Case history
- Prior actions: 230 F. Supp. 2d 830 (M.D.Tenn. 2002) (granting summary judgment for defendant), rev'd, 383 F.3d 390 (6th Cir. 2004), rehearing granted in part and opinion amended, 401 F.3d 647 (6th Cir. 2004)

Court membership
- Judges sitting: Ralph B. Guy, Jr., Ronald Lee Gilman, and Judith Barzilay (sitting by designation)

Case opinions
- District court erroneously granted summary judgment for defendant on claim for copyright infringement based on fact that defendant's copying of plaintiff's copyrighted sound recording was merely de minimis. Court of Appeals rejects de minimis defense to claim for copyright infringement of a sound recording.

Bridgeport Music, Inc. v. Dimension Films, 410 F.3d 792 (6th Cir. 2005), is a 2005 court case that was important in defining American copyright law for recorded music. The case centered on the 1990 N.W.A. track "100 Miles and Runnin'", which contains a manipulated two-second sample of the 1975 Funkadelic track "Get Off Your Ass and Jam". The sample was implemented without Funkadelic's permission and with no compensation paid to Bridgeport Music, which claimed to own the rights to Funkadelic's music.

Bridgeport brought the issue before a federal judge, who ruled that the incident was not in violation of copyright law. The U.S. Court of Appeals for the Sixth Circuit reversed the decision and ruled that the sampling was in violation of copyright law. Their argument was that with a sound recording, an owner of the copyright on a work had exclusive right to duplicate the work. Under this interpretation of the copyright law, usage of any section of a work, regardless of length, is in violation of copyright unless the copyright owner gave permission. In its decision, the court wrote: "Get a license or do not sample. We do not see this as stifling creativity in any significant way."

This decision effectively eliminates the de minimis doctrine for digitally sampling recorded music in the Sixth Circuit, and has affected industry practice. However, the court expressly noted that the decision did not preclude the availability of other defenses, such as fair use, even in the context of "sampling." Thus, in the Sixth Circuit, defendants who digitally sampled may not rely on the de minimis doctrine to say that they copied such a small amount that they are not liable for copyright infringement. However, they may still argue that their use of the sample is a fair use—that is, that the use is transformative rather than derivative.

== Influence ==
The New York University musicologist and sampling expert Lawrence Ferrara describes the effects of the Bridgeport case on sample-based music as, "extremely chilling, because it basically says that whatever you sample has to be licensed, in its most extreme interpretation."

The case has also been influential in the rest of the world: on November 20, 2008, the electronic pioneers Kraftwerk were successful in a landmark case "Metall Auf Metall" in the Federal Court of Justice of Germany (Bundesgerichtshof, abbreviated BGH), which quotes Bridgeport Music, Inc. v. Dimension Films and decided that even the smallest shreds of sounds are copyrightable and that the sampling of a drum beat can be copyright infringement. Under German law, however, this result is de lege lata—applicable only to that case. The BGH only mentioned the Bridgeport case without discussing it.

In the United States, the case has been less favorably received. Most recently and significantly, the Ninth Circuit rejected its reasoning explicitly in the 2016 VMG Salsoul v Ciccone (Madonna) case: "We recognize that the Sixth Circuit held to the contrary in Bridgeport Music, Inc. v. Dimension Films, 410 F.3d 792 (6th Cir. 2005), but—like the leading copyright treatise and several district courts—we find Bridgeport’s reasoning unpersuasive." A number of District courts have rejected the decision explicitly or declined to apply it, including courts in New York, Florida, California, and Louisiana.
