= Sampling (music) =

Reuse of sound recording in another recording

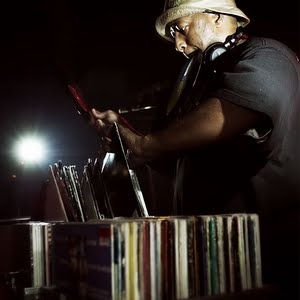
DJ Premier selecting records to sample

In sound and music, sampling is the reuse of a portion (or sample) of a sound recording in another recording. Samples may comprise elements such as rhythm, melody, speech, or sound effects. A sample might comprise only a fragment of sound, or a longer portion of music, such as a drum beat or melody. Samples are often layered, equalized, sped up or slowed down, repitched, looped, or otherwise manipulated. They are usually integrated using electronic music instruments (samplers) or software such as digital audio workstations.

A process similar to sampling originated in the 1940s with musique concrète, experimental music created by splicing and looping tape. The mid-20th century saw the introduction of keyboard instruments that played sounds recorded on tape, such as the Mellotron. The term sampling was coined in the late 1970s by the creators of the Fairlight CMI, a synthesizer with the ability to record and playback short sounds. As technology improved, cheaper standalone samplers with more memory emerged, such as the E-mu Emulator, Akai S950 and Akai MPC.

Sampling is a foundation of hip-hop, which emerged when producers in the 1980s began sampling funk and soul records, particularly drum breaks. It has influenced many other genres of music, particularly electronic music and pop. Samples such as the Amen break, the "Funky Drummer" drum break and the orchestra hit have been used in thousands of recordings. James Brown, Loleatta Holloway, Fab Five Freddy and Led Zeppelin are among the most sampled artists. The first album created entirely from samples, Endtroducing by DJ Shadow, was released in 1996.

Sampling without permission can infringe copyright or may be fair use. Clearance, the process of acquiring permission to use a sample, can be complex and costly; samples from well-known sources may be prohibitively expensive. Courts have taken different positions on whether sampling without permission is permitted. In Grand Upright Music, Ltd. v. Warner Bros. Records Inc (1991) and Bridgeport Music, Inc. v. Dimension Films (2005), American courts ruled that unlicensed sampling, however minimal, is not de minimis copying and could constitute infringement unless another defense, such as fair use, is applicable. However, VMG Salsoul v Ciccone (2016) found that unlicensed samples could constitute de minimis copying and therefore not infringe copyright. In 2019, the European Court of Justice ruled that modified, unrecognizable samples could be used without authorization. Though some artists have complained of plagiarism or lack of creativity, many commentators have argued that sampling is a creative act.

== Precursors ==
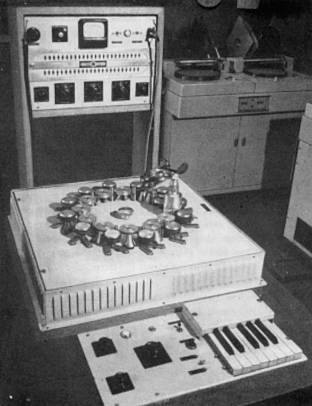
The Phonogene, a 1940s instrument which plays back sounds from tape loops

In the 1940s, the French composer Pierre Schaeffer developed musique concrète, an experimental form of music created by recording sounds to tape, splicing them, and manipulating them to create sound collages. He used sounds from the human body, locomotives, and kitchen utensils. The method also involved tape loops, splicing lengths of tape end to end so a sound could be played indefinitely. Schaeffer developed the Phonogene, which played loops at 12 different pitches triggered by a keyboard.

Composers including Pierre Henry, Karheinz Stockhausen, John Cage, Edgar Varèse, and Iannis Xenakis experimented with musique concrète. In the UK, it was brought to a mainstream audience by the BBC Radiophonic Workshop, which used the techniques to produce soundtracks for shows including Doctor Who in the early 1960s.

In the 1960s, Jamaican dub reggae producers such as King Tubby and Lee "Scratch" Perry began using recordings of reggae rhythms to produce riddim tracks, which were then deejayed over. Jamaican immigrants introduced the techniques to American hip-hop in the 1970s. Holger Czukay of the experimental German band Can spliced tape recordings into his music before the advent of digital sampling.

== Techniques and tools ==
=== Samplers ===
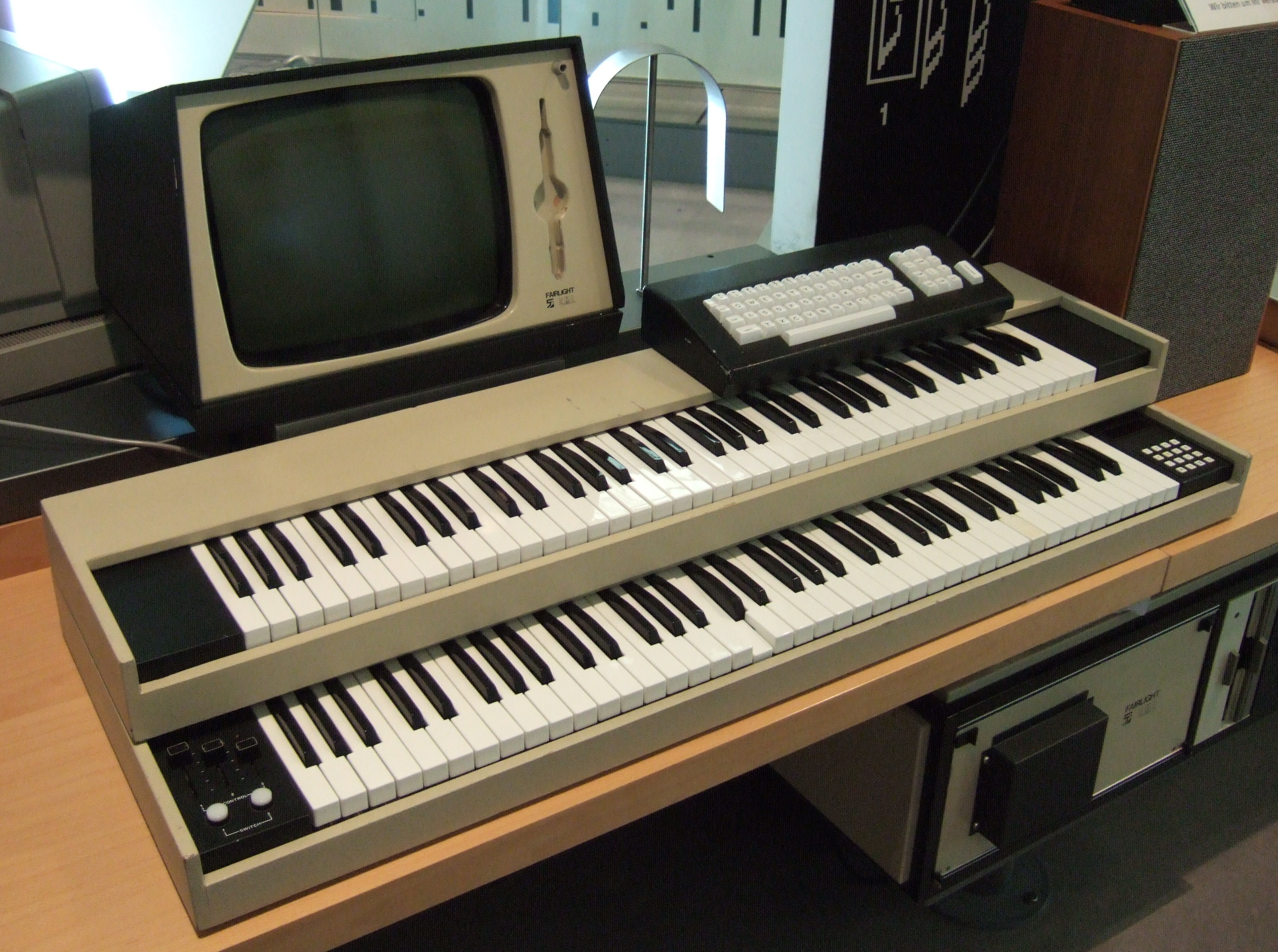
The Fairlight CMI, a sampler and synthesizer released in 1979. The designers coined the term sampling to describe one of its features.

The Guardian described the Chamberlin as the first sampler, developed by the American engineer Harry Chamberlin in the 1940s. The Chamberlin used a keyboard to trigger a series of tape decks, each containing eight seconds of sound. Similar technology was popularised in the 60s with the Mellotron. In 1969, the English engineer Peter Zinovieff developed the first digital sampler, the EMS Musys.

The term sample was coined by Kim Ryrie and Peter Vogel to describe a feature of their Fairlight CMI synthesizer, launched in 1979. While developing the Fairlight, Vogel recorded around a second of piano performance from a radio broadcast and discovered that he could imitate a piano by playing the recording back at different pitches. The result better resembled a real piano than sounds generated by synthesizers. Compared to later samplers, the Fairlight was limited; it allowed control over pitch and envelope, and could only record a few seconds of sound. However, the sampling function became its most popular feature. Though the concept of reusing recordings in other recordings was not new, the Fairlight's design and built-in sequencer simplified the process.

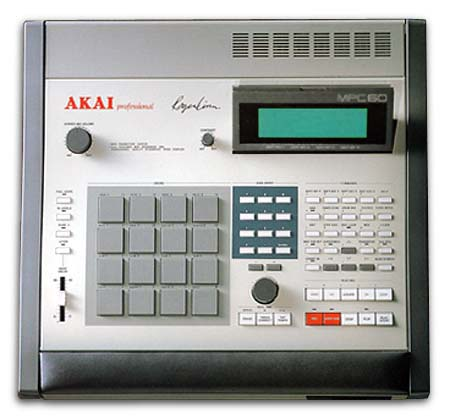
The Akai MPC, an influential sampler produced from 1988

The Fairlight inspired competition, improving sampling technology and driving down prices. Early competitors included the E-mu Emulator and the Akai S950. Drum machines such as the Oberheim DMX and Linn LM-1 incorporated samples of drum kits and percussion rather than generating sounds from circuits. Early samplers could store samples of only a few seconds in length, but this increased with improved memory. In 1988, Akai released the first MPC sampler, which allowed users to assign samples to pads and trigger them independently, similarly to playing a keyboard or drum kit. It was followed by competing samplers from companies including Korg, Roland and Casio.

Today, most samples are recorded and edited using digital audio workstations (DAWs) such as Pro Tools and Ableton Live. As technology has improved, the possibilities for manipulation have grown. Sampling longer sections of music is known as loop sampling; cutting and rearranging sections of a loop to create a new rhythm or melody is known as chop sampling; sampling a short, isolated sound such as a drum hit or vocal snippet is known as one-shot sampling.

=== Sample libraries ===
Samples are distributed in sample libraries, also known as sample packs. In the 1990s, sample libraries from companies such as Zero-G and Spectrasonics were widely used in contemporary music. In the 2000s, Apple introduced "Jam Pack" sample libraries for its DAW GarageBand. In the 2010s, producers began releasing sample packs on online platforms such as Splice.

The Kingsway Music Library, created in 2015 by the American producer Frank Dukes, has been used by artists including Drake, Kanye West, Kendrick Lamar, and J. Cole. In 2020, the US Library of Congress created an open-source web application that allows users to sample its library of copyright-free audio.

=== Interpolation ===
Instead of sampling, artists may recreate a recording, a process known as interpolation. This requires only the permission of the owners of the musical content, rather than the owners of the recording. It also creates more freedom to alter constituent components such as separate guitar and drum tracks. In a 2022 Guardian article, Oliver Keens wrote that interpolation poses an ethical question as it means the owner of the recording is not paid.

== Impact ==
Sampling has influenced many genres of music, particularly pop, hip-hop and electronic music. The Guardian journalist David McNamee likened its importance in these genres to the importance of the guitar in rock. In August 2022, the Guardian noted that half of the singles in the top 10 of the UK singles chart that week used samples. Sampling is a fundamental element of remix culture.

=== Early works ===
Using the Fairlight, the "first truly world-changing sampler", the English producer Trevor Horn became the "key architect" in incorporating sampling into pop music in the 1980s. Other users of the Fairlight included Kate Bush, Peter Gabriel and Thomas Dolby. In the 1980s, samples were incorporated into synthesizers and music workstations, such as the bestselling Korg M1, released in 1988.

The Akai MPC, released in 1988, had a major influence on electronic and hip-hop music, allowing artists to create elaborate tracks without other instruments, a studio or formal music knowledge. Its designer, Roger Linn, anticipated that users would sample short sounds, such as individual notes or drum hits, to use as building blocks for compositions; however, users sampled longer passages of music. In the words of Greg Milner, author of Perfecting Sound Forever, musicians "didn't just want the sound of John Bonham's kick drum, they wanted to loop and repeat the whole of 'When the Levee Breaks'." Linn said: "It was a very pleasant surprise. After 60 years of recording, there are so many prerecorded examples to sample from. Why reinvent the wheel?"

Stevie Wonder's 1979 album Journey Through the Secret Life of Plants may have been the first album to make extensive use of samples. The Japanese electronic band Yellow Magic Orchestra were pioneers in sampling, constructing music by looping fragments of sound. Their album Technodelic (1981) is an early example of an album consisting mostly of samples. My Life in the Bush of Ghosts (1981) by David Byrne and Brian Eno is another important early work of sampling, incorporating samples of sources including Arabic singers, radio DJs and an exorcist. Musicians had used similar techniques before, but, according to the Guardian writer Dave Simpson, sampling had never before been used "to such cataclysmic effect". Eno felt the album's innovation was to make samples "the lead vocal". Big Audio Dynamite pioneered sampling in rock and pop with their 1985 album This Is Big Audio Dynamite.

=== Hip-hop ===
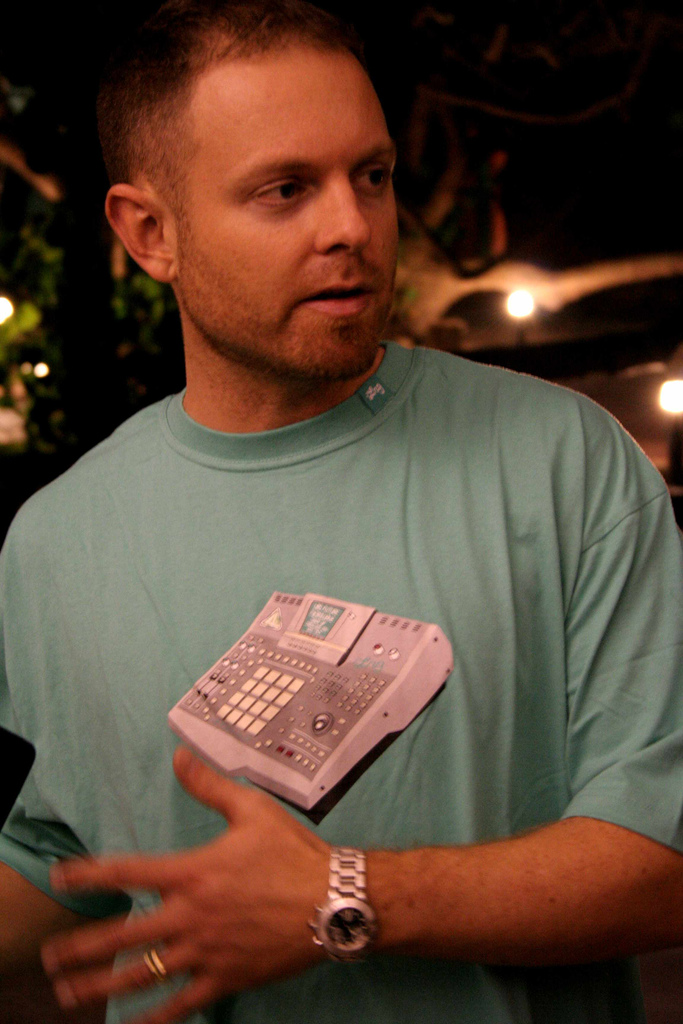
DJ Shadow's 1996 album Endtroducing is cited as the first created entirely from samples.

Sampling is one of the foundations of hip-hop, which emerged in the 1980s. Hip-hop sampling has been likened to the origins of blues and rock, which were created by repurposing existing music. The Guardian journalist David McNamee wrote that "two record decks and your dad's old funk collection was once the working-class black answer to punk".

Before the rise of sampling, DJs used turntables to loop breaks from records, which MCs would rap over. Compilation albums such as Ultimate Breaks and Beats compiled tracks with drum breaks and solos intended for sampling, aimed at DJs and hip-hop producers. In 1986, the tracks "South Bronx", "Eric B. is President" and "It's a Demo" sampled the funk and soul tracks of James Brown, particularly a drum break from "Funky Drummer" (1970), helping popularize the technique.

The advent of affordable samplers such as the Akai MPC (1988) made looping easier. Guinness World Records cites DJ Shadow's acclaimed hip-hop album Endtroducing (1996), made on an MPC60, as the first album created entirely from samples. The E-mu SP-1200, released in 1987, had a ten-second sample length and a distinctive "gritty" sound, and was used extensively by East Coast producers during the golden age of hip-hop of the late 1980s and early 90s. By the late 2010s, hip hop had become the dominant musical genre, influencing pop acts towards greater use of sampling.

=== Common samples ===
The Amen break
The widely sampled "Amen break" as it originally appeared, on "Amen, Brother" (1969) by the Winstons

Commonly sampled elements include strings, basslines, drum loops, vocal hooks or entire bars of music, especially from soul records. Samples may be layered, equalized, sped up or slowed down, repitched, looped or otherwise manipulated.

A seven-second drum break in the 1969 track "Amen, Brother", known as the Amen break, became popular with American hip-hop producers and then British jungle producers in the early 1990s. It has been used in thousands of recordings, including songs by rock bands such as Oasis and theme tunes for television shows such as Futurama, and is among the most sampled tracks in music history. Other widely sampled drum breaks include the break from the 1970 James Brown song "Funky Drummer"; the Think break, sampled from the 1972 Lyn Collins song "Think (About It)", written by Brown; and the drum intro from Led Zeppelin's 1971 song "When the Levee Breaks", played by John Bonham and sampled by artists including the Beastie Boys, Dr. Dre, Eminem and Massive Attack.

In 2014, the Smithsonian cited the most sampled track as "Change the Beat" (1982) by Fab Five Freddy. According to WhoSampled, a user-edited website that catalogs samples, James Brown is sampled in more than 3,000 tracks, more than any other artist. In 2011, The Independent named Loleatta Holloway, whose vocals were sampled in house and dance tracks such as "Ride on Time" (1989) by Black Box, as the most sampled female singer. The orchestra hit, widely used in hip-hop, originated as a sound on the Fairlight, sampled from Stravinsky's 1910 orchestral work Firebird Suite. MusicRadar cited the Zero-G Datafiles sample libraries as an influence on 90s dance music, becoming the "de facto source of breakbeats, bass and vocal samples".

== Legal and ethical issues ==
To legally use a sample, an artist must acquire legal permission from the copyright holder, a potentially lengthy and complex process known as clearance. Sampling without permission can breach the copyright of the original sound recording, of the composition and lyrics, and of the performances, such as a rhythm or guitar riff. The moral rights of the original artist may also be breached if they are not credited or object to the sampling. In some cases, sampling is protected under American fair use laws, which grant "limited use of copyrighted material without permission from the rights holder".

The American musician Richard Lewis Spencer, who owned the copyright for the widely sampled Amen break, never received royalties for its use as the statute of limitations for copyright infringement had passed by the time he learnt of the situation. The journalist Simon Reynolds likened it to "the man who goes to the sperm bank and unknowingly sires hundreds of children". Clyde Stubblefield, the performer of the widely sampled drum break from "Funky Drummer", also received no royalties. The owner of sampled material may not always be traceable, and such knowledge is commonly mislaid through corporate mergers, closures and buyouts.

DJ Shadow said that artists tended to either see sampling as a mark of respect and a means to introduce their music to new audiences, or to be protective of their legacy and see no benefit. He described the difficulty of arranging compensation for each artist sampled in a work, and gave the example of two artists both demanding more than 50%, a mathematical impossibility. He instead advocated for a process of clearing samples on a musicological basis by identifying how much of the composition the sample comprises.

According to Fact, early hip-hop sampling was governed by "unspoken" rules forbidding the sampling of recent records, reissues, other hip-hop records or non-vinyl sources, among other restrictions. These rules were relaxed as younger producers took over and sampling became ubiquitous. In 2017, DJ Shadow said he felt that "music has never been worth less as a commodity, and yet sampling has never been more risky".

Sampling can help popularize the sampled work. For example, the Desiigner track "Panda" (2015) reached number one on the Billboard Hot 100 after Kanye West sampled it on "Father Stretch My Hands, Pt. 2" (2016). Some record labels and other music licensing companies have simplified their clearance processes by "pre-clearing" their records. For example, the Los Angeles record label Now-Again Records has cleared songs produced for West and Pusha T in a matter of hours.

=== Lawsuits ===
In 1989, the Turtles sued De La Soul for using an unlicensed sample on their album 3 Feet High and Rising. The Turtles singer, Mark Volman, told the Los Angeles Times: "Sampling is just a longer term for theft. Anybody who can honestly say sampling is some sort of creativity has never done anything creative." The case was settled out of court and set a legal precedent that had a chilling effect on sampling in hip-hop.

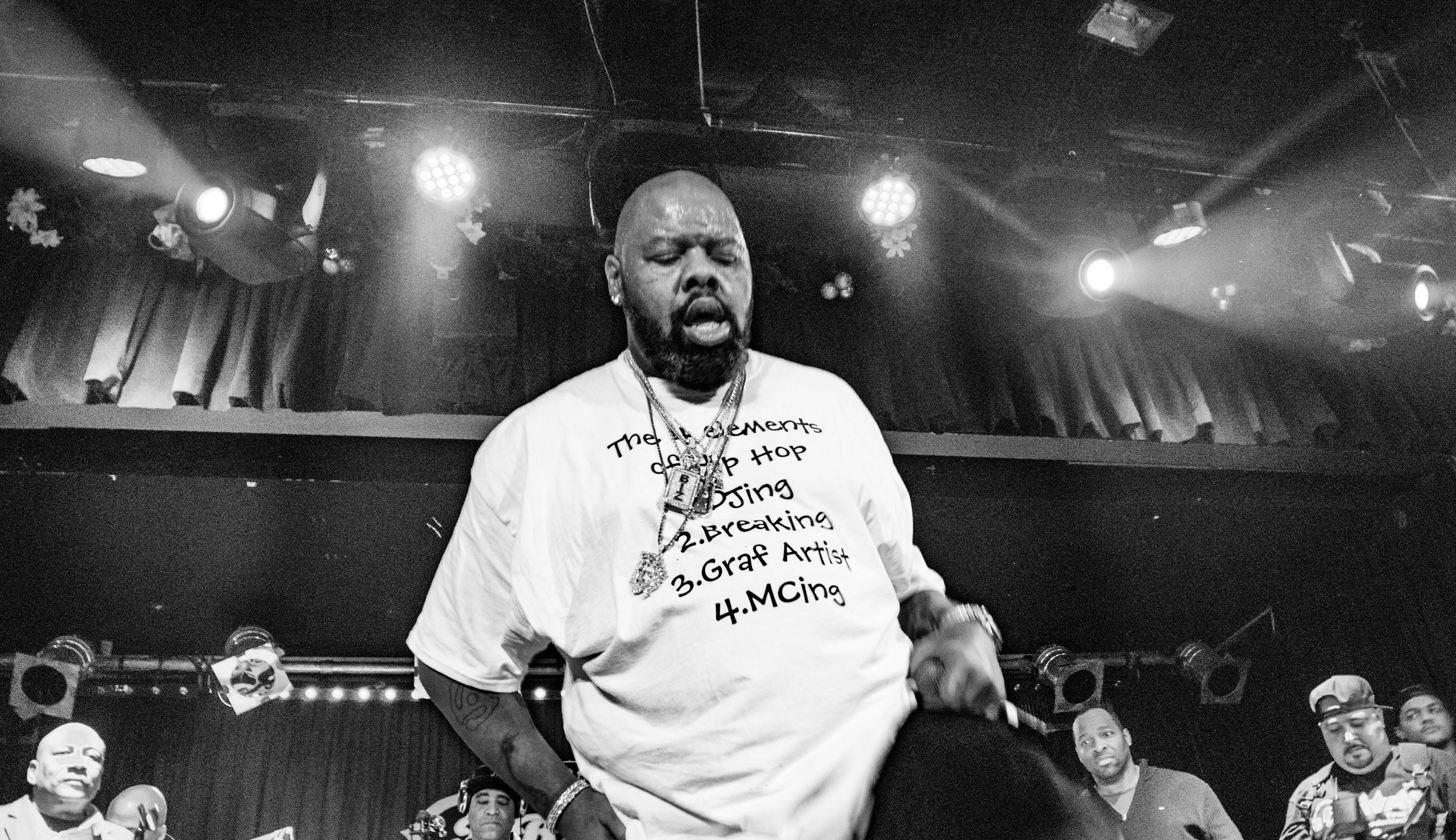
Biz Markie in 2016

In 1991, the songwriter Gilbert O'Sullivan sued the rapper Biz Markie after Markie sampled O'Sullivan's "Alone Again (Naturally)" on the album I Need a Haircut. In Grand Upright Music, Ltd. v. Warner Bros. Records Inc, the court ruled that sampling without permission infringed copyright. Instead of asking for royalties, O'Sullivan forced Markie's label, Warner Bros, to recall the album until the song was removed.

The journalist Dan Charnas criticized the ruling, saying it was difficult to apply conventional copyright laws to sampling and that the American legal system did not have "the cultural capacity to understand this culture and how kids relate to it". In 2005, the writer Nelson George described it as the "most damaging example of anti-hip-hop vindictiveness", which "sent a chill through the industry that is still felt". In the Washington Post, Chris Richards wrote in 2018 that no case had exerted more influence on pop music, likening it to banning a musical instrument. Some have accused the law of restricting creativity, while others argue that it forces producers to innovate.

Since the O'Sullivan lawsuit, samples on commercial recordings have typically been taken either from obscure recordings or cleared, an often expensive option only available to successful acts. According to the Guardian, "Sampling became risky business and a rich man's game, with record labels regularly checking if their musical property had been tea-leafed." For less successful artists, the legal implications of using samples pose obstacles; according to Fact, "For a bedroom producer, clearing a sample can be nearly impossible, both financially and in terms of administration." By comparison, the 1989 Beastie Boys album Paul's Boutique is composed almost entirely of samples, most of which were cleared "easily and affordably"; the clearance process would be much more expensive today. The Washington Post described the modern use of well known samples, such as on records by Kanye West, as an act of conspicuous consumption similar to flaunting cars or jewelry. West has been sued several times over his use of samples.

==== De minimis use ====
In 2000, the jazz flautist James Newton filed a claim against the Beastie Boys' 1992 single "Pass the Mic", which samples his composition "Choir". The judge found that the sample, comprising six seconds and three notes, was de minimis (small enough to be trivial) and did not require clearance. Newton lost appeals in 2003 and 2004.

In the 2005 case Bridgeport Music, Inc. v. Dimension Films, the hip-hop group N.W.A. were successfully sued for their use of a two-second sample of a Funkadelic song in the 1990 track "100 Miles and Runnin'". The United States Court of Appeals for the Sixth Circuit ruled that all samples, no matter how short, required a license. A judge wrote: "Get a license or do not sample. We do not see this as stifling creativity in any significant way."

As the Bridgeport judgement was decided in an American circuit court, lower courts ruling on similar issues are bound to abide by it. However, in the 2016 case VMG Salsoul v Ciccone, the United States Court of Appeals for the Ninth Circuit ruled that Madonna did not require a license for a short horn sample in her 1990 song "Vogue". The judge Susan Graber wrote that she did not see why sampling law should be an exception to standard de minimis law.

In 2019, the European Court of Justice ruled that the producers Moses Pelham and Martin Haas had illegally sampled a drum sequence from the 1977 Kraftwerk track "Metal on Metal" for the Sabrina Setlur song "Nur Mir". The court ruled that permission was required for recognizable samples; modified, unrecognizable samples could still be used without authorization.

== See also ==
- Remix
- Mashup (music)
- Chopped and screwed
- Musical quotation
- Plunderphonics
- Recombinant culture
- Riddim
- Beat slicing
