= De minimis fringe benefit =

Low-value perks provided by an employer

De minimis fringe benefits are low-value perks provided by an employer; de minimis is legal Latin for "minimal".

Perks that are determined to be de minimis fringe benefits may not be accounted or taxed in some jurisdictions as having too small value and too complicated accounting.

== United States ==
=== Definition ===
Under US Internal Revenue Service Code § 132(a)(4), “de minimis fringe” benefits provided by the employer can be excluded from the employee’s gross income. “De minimis fringe” means any property or service whose value (after taking account of the frequency with which the employer provides smaller fringes to his employees) is so small as to make accounting for it unreasonable or administratively impracticable. As a practical matter, 132(a)(4) is a narrowly defined rule of administrative convenience.

=== Qualification as a de minimis fringe benefit ===
For any property or service to qualify as a "de minimis fringe", it must be unusual or occasional in frequency, and its value cannot be a disguised form of compensation.

Generally, the Internal Revenue Service considers the following three factors:

1. the frequency of the benefit
2. the value of the benefit
3. the administrative impracticality.

De minimis fringe is defined in Internal Revenue Code section 132(e)(1) as any property or service given to an employee by the employer whose value, after taking account of the frequency provided, is so small as to make accounting for it unreasonable or administratively impracticable. Examples of de minimis fringe include personal use of a cell phone provided by the employer primarily for business purposes; occasional personal use of the employer's copier; holiday gifts, other than cash or gift cards, with a low fair-market value; occasional parties or picnics for employees and their guests; occasional tickets for theater or sporting events.

Under Section 1.132-6(b)(1) of the Treasury Regulations, all similar fringes must be considered together to determine whether they are de minimis. One free meal given to all employees once a year would qualify because the meals are infrequently provided. One free meal provided to a different employee each week throughout the year would not qualify.

Under Section 1.132-6(c) of the Treasury Regulations, cash never qualifies as a de minimis fringe. Cash or gift certificates provided to an employee so the employee may buy a theater ticket does not qualify. It would qualify, however, if the employer purchases the theater ticket, provides the actual theater ticket to the employee, and the employer infrequently gives out tickets to employees.

Gift cards never qualify if they are redeemable for general merchandise or have a cash-equivalent value. Gift cards do not qualify if they have a specific face value and are redeemable for merchandise at a store. If a gift certificate allows an employee to receive a specific item of low-value personal property, it is administratively impractical for the employer to account for the gift certificate, and the employer infrequently provides gift certificates to employees, then the gift certificate qualifies.

The Internal Revenue Service does not define "low value", but in Chief Counsel Advice Memorandum 200108042 it states that an item worth $100 is not a low-value item.

While the Internal Revenue Service does not define "infrequently", gifts to employees on a quarterly basis would not qualify as a de minimis fringe benefit.

==== Examples of de minimis fringe benefits ====
1. occasional employee use of photocopier if the employer sufficiently controls its use and 85% of its use is for business purposes;
2. occasional typing of personal letters by a company secretary;
3. occasional snacks (e.g., coffee, donuts, candy, etc.);
4. occasional tickets for entertainment or sporting events;
5. holiday and birthday gifts (not cash) with a low fair-market value;
6. occasional meal and transportation money when an employee must work overtime;
7. occasional usage of office stationery (pen, envelope, paper, staple, postage stamp etc.) for individual personal tasks — e.g. mailing a letter to a friend, paying a traffic ticket, writing, writing a sticky note about an errand to do on the way home after work
8. group-term life insurance payable on death of an employee’s spouse or dependent if the face value is no greater than $2000;
9. flowers, fruits, books, etc. provided under special circumstances (e.g. illness or family crisis); and
10. occasional parties or picnics for employees and their guests.

==== Examples of property or services not de minimis fringe benefits ====
1. cash;
2. gift certificates or cash-equivalent vouchers;
3. employee discounts;
4. employee achievement awards;
5. season tickets to sporting or theatrical events;
6. membership to a private country club or athletic facility; and
7. certain transportation costs.

==== Tax consequences for the employee ====
If the property or services provided to the employee qualify as a “de minimis fringe” benefit, then the employee is allowed not to report the amount.
