= State income tax in the United States =

Form of taxation in the United States

Top Marginal State Income Tax Withholding Rate in 2022

In addition to federal income tax collected by the United States, most individual U.S. states collect a state income tax. Some local governments also impose an income tax, often based on state income tax calculations. 41 states, the District of Columbia, and many localities in the United States impose an income tax on individuals. Nine states impose no state income tax. Forty-seven states and many localities impose a tax on the income of corporations.

State income tax is imposed at a fixed or graduated rate on taxable income of individuals, corporations, and certain estates and trusts. These tax rates vary by state and by entity type. Taxable income conforms closely to federal taxable income in most states with limited modifications. States are prohibited from taxing income from federal bonds or other federal obligations. Most states do not tax Social Security benefits or interest income from obligations of that state. In computing the deduction for depreciation, several states require different useful lives and methods be used by businesses. Many states allow a standard deduction or some form of itemized deductions. States allow a variety of tax credits in computing tax.

Each state administers its own tax system. Many states also administer the tax return and collection process for localities within the state that impose income tax.

State income tax is allowed as an itemized deduction in computing federal income tax, subject to limitations for individuals.

== Basic principles ==
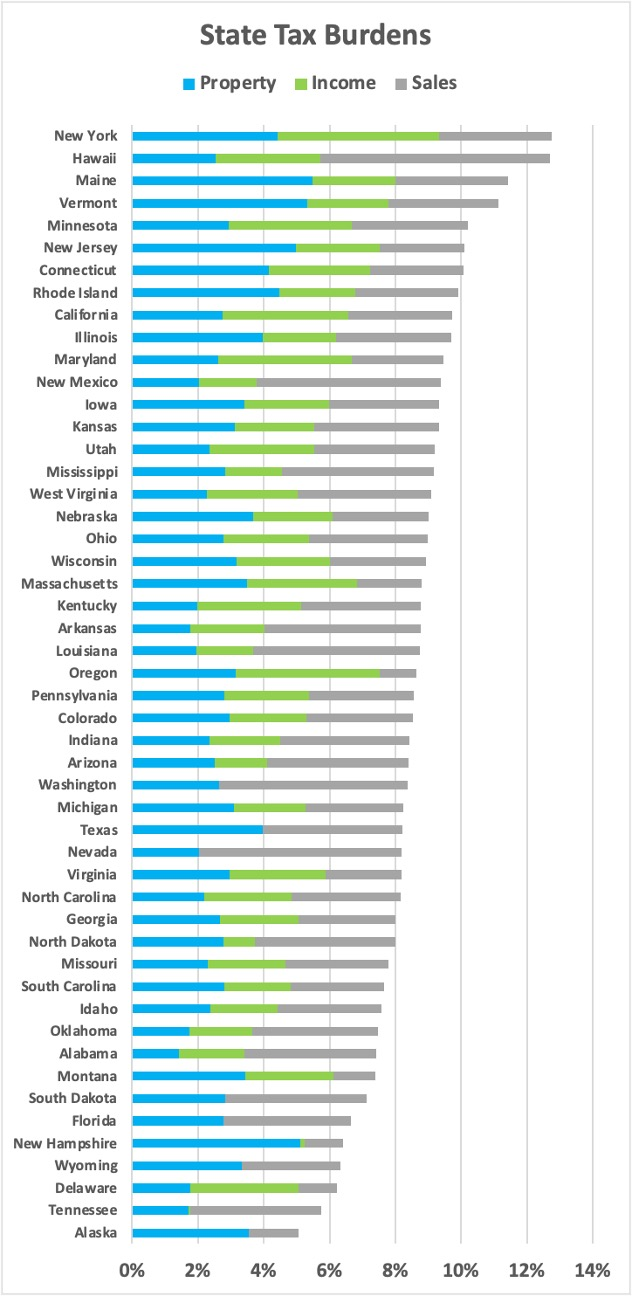
State Tax Burdens 2022 % of income

State tax rules vary widely. The tax rate may be fixed for all income levels and taxpayers of a certain type, or it may be graduated. Tax rates may differ for individuals and corporations.

Most states conform to federal rules for determining:

- gross income,
- timing of recognition of income and deductions,
- most aspects of business deductions,
- characterization of business entities as either corporations, partnerships, or disregarded entities.

Gross income generally includes all income earned or received from whatever source with some exceptions. States are prohibited from taxing income from federal bonds or other federal obligations. Most states also exempt income from bonds issued by that state or localities within the state as well as some portion or all of Social Security benefits. Many states provide tax exemption for certain other types of income, which varies widely by state. States uniformly allow reduction of gross income for cost of goods sold, though the computation of this amount may be subject to some modifications.

Most states provide for modification of both business and non-business deductions. All states taxing business income allow deduction for most business expenses. Many require that depreciation deductions be computed in manners different from at least some of those permitted for federal income tax purposes. For example, many states do not allow the additional first year bonus depreciation deduction.

Most states tax capital gain and dividend income in the same manner as other investment income. In this respect, individuals and corporations not resident in the state generally are not required to pay any income tax to that state with respect to such income.

Some states have alternative measures of tax. These include analogs to the federal Alternative Minimum Tax in four states, as well as measures for corporations not based on income, such as capital stock taxes imposed by many states.

Income tax is self assessed, and individual and corporate taxpayers in all states imposing an income tax must file tax returns in each year their income exceeds certain amounts determined by each state. Returns are also required by partnerships doing business in the state. Many states require that a copy of the federal income tax return be attached to their state income tax returns. The deadline for filing returns varies by state and type of return, but for individuals in many states is the same as the federal deadline, typically April 15.

Every state, including those with no income tax, has a state taxing authority with power to examine (audit) and adjust returns filed with it. Most tax authorities have appeals procedures for audits, and all states permit taxpayers to go to court in disputes with the tax authorities. Procedures and deadlines vary widely by state. All states have a statute of limitations prohibiting the state from adjusting taxes beyond a certain period following filing returns.

All states have tax collection mechanisms. States with an income tax require employers to withhold state income tax on wages earned within the state. Some states have other withholding mechanisms, particularly with respect to partnerships. Most states require taxpayers to make quarterly estimated tax payments not expected to be satisfied by withholding tax.

All states impose penalties for failing to file required tax returns and/or pay tax when due. In addition, all states impose interest charges on late payments of tax, and generally also on additional taxes due upon adjustment by the taxing authority.

== Individual income tax ==
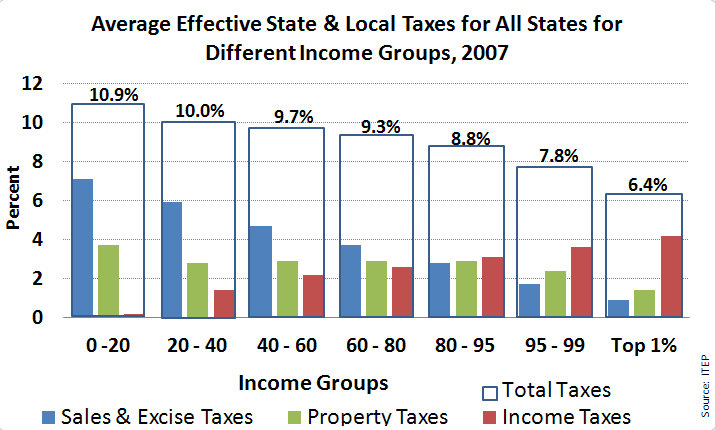
The average effective state and local taxes for all states for different income groups. Sales taxes and excise taxes (blue), property taxes (green), state income taxes (red), and total taxes (clear).

Forty-one states impose a tax on the income of individuals, sometimes referred to as personal income tax. State income tax rates vary widely from state to state. States imposing an income tax on individuals tax all taxable income (as defined in the state) of residents, as well as all income of nonresidents from sources within the state. Residents are allowed a credit for taxes paid to other states. Income from sources within a state includes wages for services within the state as well as income from a business with operations in the state. Where income is from multiple sources, formulary apportionment may be required for nonresidents. Generally, wages are apportioned based on the ratio of days worked in the state to total days worked.

All states that impose an individual income tax allow most business deductions. However, many states impose different limits on certain deductions, especially depreciation of business assets. Most states allow non-business deductions in a manner similar to federal rules. Few allow a deduction for state income taxes, though some states allow a deduction for local income taxes. Six of the states allow a full or partial deduction for federal income tax.

In addition, some states allow cities and/or counties to impose income taxes. For example, most Ohio cities and towns impose an income tax on individuals and corporations. By contrast, in New York, only New York City and Yonkers impose a municipal income tax. Yonkers levies an earnings tax of 0.5% on the wages and net earnings from self-employment of nonresidents, reported on Form Y-203.

In June 2025, the Puerto Rican Senate approved House Bill 505, which imposes a 4% tax on new individual beneficiaries under Law 60-2019, known as the Puerto Rican Incentives Code. The bill is part of a broader review of the tax incentive system, amid a public debate on the law's real benefits for the local economy.

=== States with no individual income tax ===
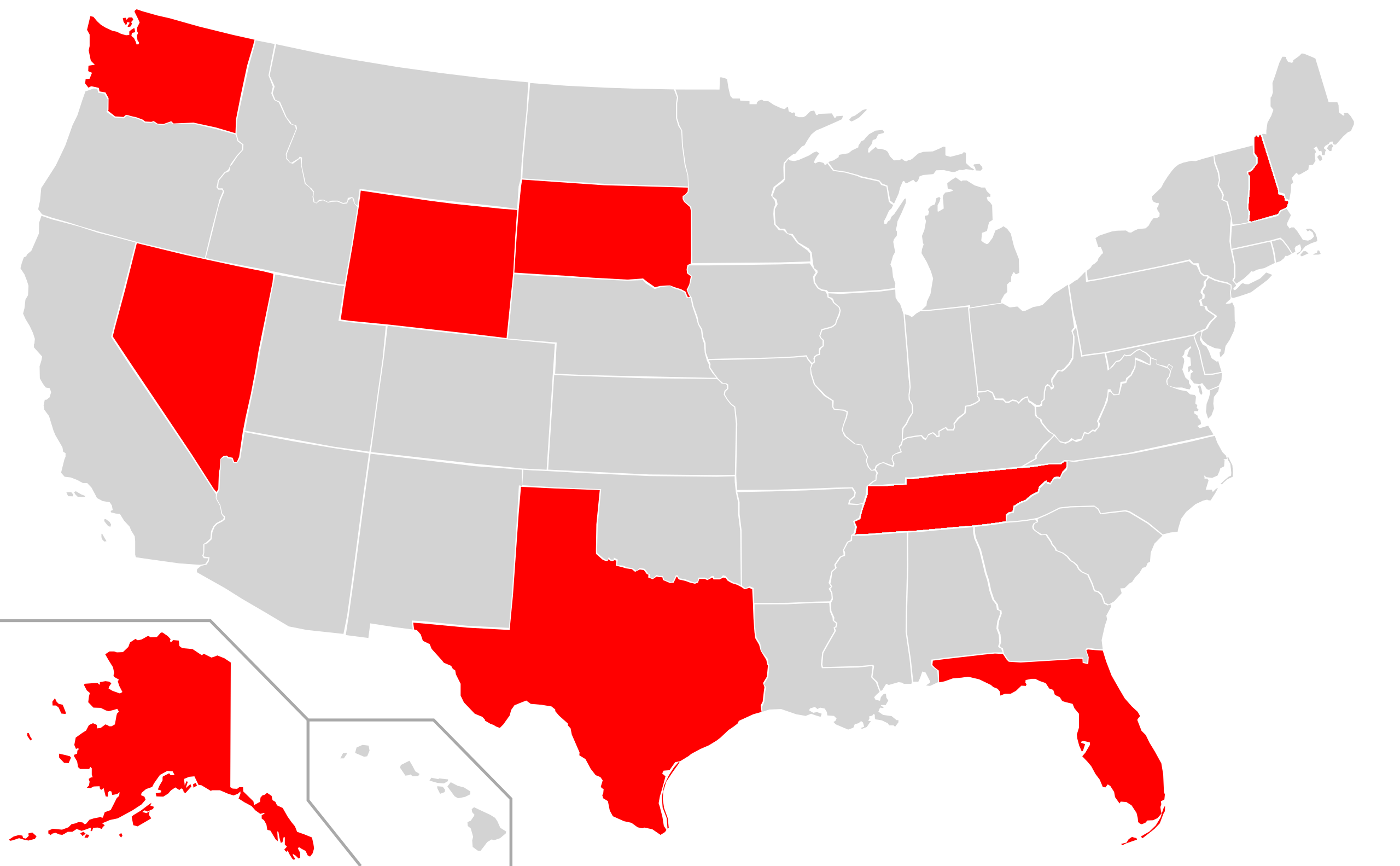
States with no state individual income tax are in red.

Nine U.S. states do not levy a broad-based individual income tax.

1. Alaska – no individual tax but has a state corporate income tax. Alaska has no state sales tax, but lets local governments collect their own sales taxes. Alaska has an annual Permanent Fund Dividend, derived from oil revenues, for all citizens living in Alaska after one calendar year, except for some convicted of criminal offenses.
2. Florida – no individual income tax but has a 5.5% corporate income tax. The state once had a tax on "intangible personal property" held on the first day of the year (stocks, bonds, mutual funds, money market funds, etc.), but it was abolished at the start of 2007.
3. Nevada – no individual or corporate income tax. Nevada gets most of its revenue from sales taxes as well as taxes on the gambling and mining industries.
4. New Hampshire – The accelerated phase-out of a tax on dividends and interest completed at the start of 2025. For large businesses, the 0.55% Business Enterprise Tax is essentially an income tax. The state also has a 7.5% (2026) Business Profits Tax.
5. South Dakota – no individual income tax but has a state franchise income tax on financial institutions.
6. Tennessee – has no individual income tax. In 2014 voters approved an amendment to the state constitution prohibiting state or local governments from levying any income tax. Prior to January 1, 2021 Tennessee had the "Hall income tax", a tax on certain interest and dividend income from investments.
7. Texas – no individual income tax but imposes a franchise tax on corporations. In May 2007, the legislature modified the franchise tax by enacting a modified gross margin tax on certain businesses (sole proprietorships and some partnerships were automatically exempt; corporations with receipts below a certain level were also exempt as were corporations whose tax liability was also below a specified amount), which was amended in 2009 and again in 2023, both times to increase the exemption level (the 2023 amendment also eliminated the requirement to file an annual "non-payment form" and the nominal penalty for not doing so). The Texas Constitution bans the passage of an income tax with a 2/3 majority of the legislature required to repeal the ban. Local governments have no authority to impose personal or corporate income taxes.
8. Washington – no individual tax but has a business and occupation tax (B&O) on gross receipts, applied to "almost all businesses located or doing business in Washington." It varies from 0.138% to 3.3% depending on the type of industry. In July 2017, the Seattle City Council approved an income tax on Seattle residents, making the city the only one in the state with an income tax, but it was ruled unconstitutional by the King County Superior Court. The Court of Appeals upheld that ruling and the Washington Supreme Court declined to hear the case. In 2022 Washington began taxing capital gains exceeding $250,000. In March 2026, Washington governor Bob Ferguson signed into law SB 6346, imposing a 9.9% tax on household income exceeding $1 million annually, effective January 1, 2028. The bill passed the Senate 27–22 on February 16, 2026, and the House 51–46 on March 10, 2026. The tax is structured as an excise tax on high earners and is expected to generate approximately $3.5 billion annually.
9. Wyoming – no individual or corporate income taxes.

=== States with flat rate individual income tax ===
As of 2026, 15 states have a flat rate individual income tax:

1. Arizona – 2.5%
2. Colorado – 4.4%
3. Georgia – 5.39%
4. Idaho – 5.695%
5. Illinois – 4.95%
6. Indiana – 3%
7. Iowa – 3.8%
8. Kentucky – 4%
9. Louisiana – 3%
10. Michigan – 4.25%
11. Mississippi – 4.4%
12. North Carolina – 3.99%
13. Ohio – 2.75%
14. Pennsylvania – 3.07%
15. Utah – 4.55%

=== States with local income taxes in addition to state-level income tax ===
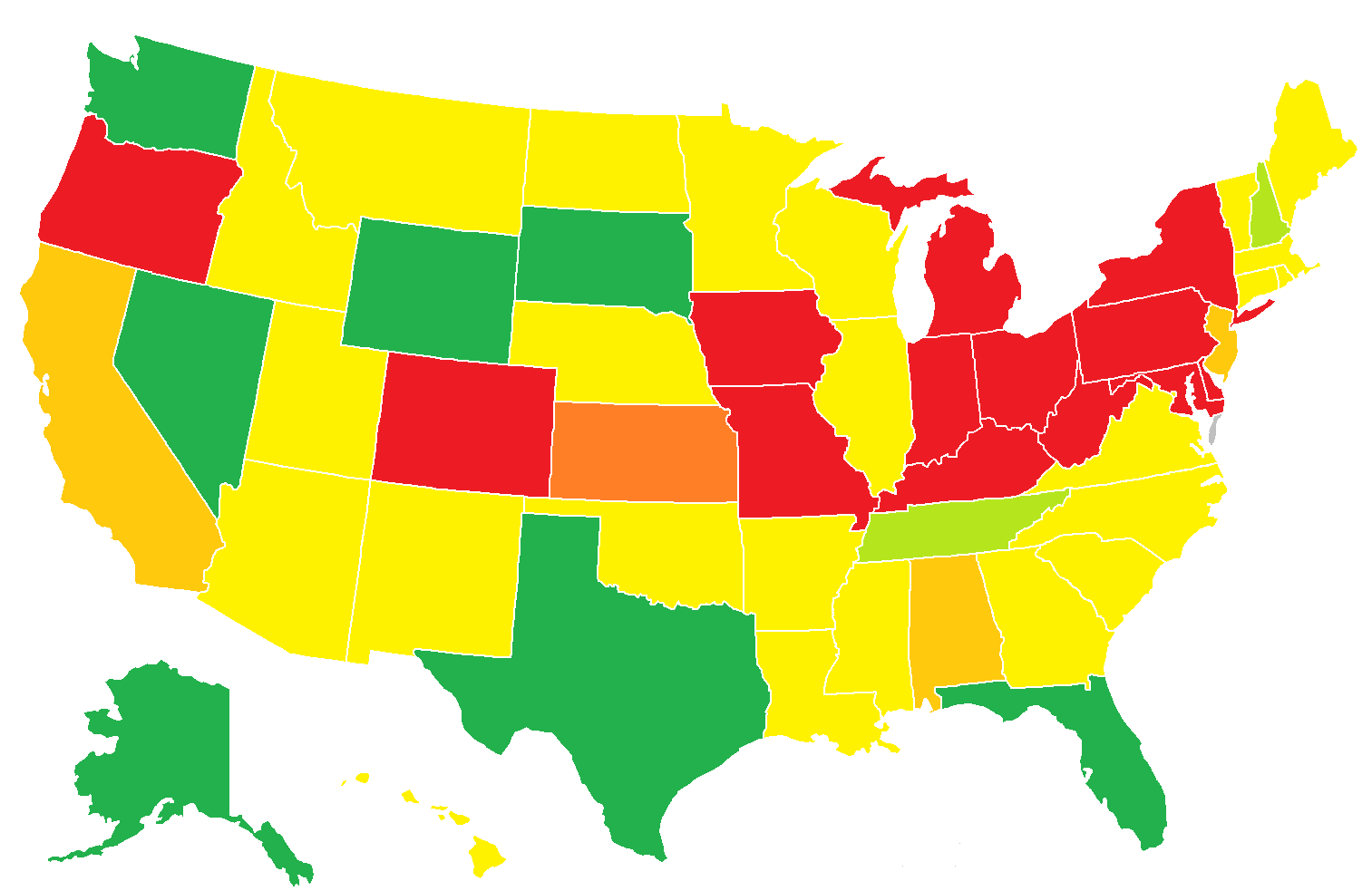
Green - States without state-level or local-level individual income taxes Light Green - States with state-level individual income tax on interest and dividends only but no local-level individual income taxes Yellow - States with state-level individual income tax but no local-level individual income taxes are in yellow. Light Orange - States with state-level individual income tax and local-level individual income taxes on payroll only are in dark yellow/light orange. Orange - States with state-level individual income tax and local-level individual income tax on interest and dividends only Red - States with state-level and local-level individual income taxes

The following states have local income taxes. These are generally imposed at a flat rate and tend to apply to a limited set of income items.

Alabama:

- Some counties, including Macon County, and municipalities, including Birmingham (employees on payroll only)

California:

- San Francisco (payroll only)

Colorado:

- Some municipalities, including Denver and Aurora (flat-fee Occupational Privilege tax for privilege of working or conducting business; filed with municipality imposing fee)

Delaware:

- Wilmington (earned, certain Schedule E income, as well as capital gains from sale of property used in business; income must be reported to the City of Wilmington if Wilmington tax is not withheld by employer.)

Indiana (all local taxes reported on state income tax form):

- All counties

Iowa (all local taxes reported on state income tax form):

- Many school districts and a few counties

Kansas:

- Some counties and municipalities (interest and dividend income; reported on separate state form 200 filed with the county clerk)

Kentucky:

- Most counties, including Kenton County, Kentucky, and municipalities, including Louisville and Lexington (earned income and certain rental income that qualifies as a business; reported as Occupational License fee/tax by employer or as Net Profits tax by business, filed with county or municipality imposing tax)

Maryland (all local taxes reported on state income tax form):

- All counties, and the independent city of Baltimore

Michigan:

- Many cities, including Detroit, Lansing, and Flint (most income above a certain annual threshold; reported on form issued by imposing city or on separate state form 5118/5119/5120 in the case of Detroit)

Missouri (all other cities are prohibited from imposing local income tax):

- Kansas City (earned income; income must be reported to Kansas City if city tax is not withheld by employer; residents must file the Earnings tax form to report wages on which Kansas City income tax is not withheld and the Business Earnings tax form to report self-employment income)
- St. Louis (earned income; income must be reported to the City of St. Louis if St. Louis tax is not withheld by employer; residents must file the Earnings tax form to report wages on which St. Louis income tax is not withheld and the Business Earnings tax form to report self-employment income)

New Jersey:

- Newark and Jersey City (payroll only)

New York (all local taxes reported on state income tax form):

- New York City (employees with NYC section 1127 withholding should also file New York City Form 1127)
- Yonkers
- Metropolitan Commuter Transportation District (self-employed with income sourced from New York City, as well as the counties of Dutchess, Nassau, Orange, Putnam, Rockland, Suffolk, and Westchester)

Ohio:

- Some school districts (either traditional or earned income tax base; reported on separate state form SD-100).
- RITA (Regional Income Tax Agency).
- Most cities and villages (more than 600 out of 931) on earned income and rental income. Some municipalities require all residents over a certain age to file, while others require residents to file only if municipal income tax is not withheld by employer. Income is reported on a tax form issued by the municipal income tax collector, currently Cleveland's Central Collection Agency (CCA) or the Regional Income Tax Authority (RITA), or a collecting municipality. Municipalities such as Columbus and Cincinnati sometimes also collect for neighboring towns and villages.

Oregon:

- Portland (all residents must file an Arts Tax form with the city to either pay the flat-fee tax or qualify for an exemption based on low individual or household income)
- Multnomah County, Oregon
- Lane Transit District (self-employed with income sourced from Lane Transit District, which includes parts of Lane County; reported on separate state tax form LTD)
- Tri-County Metropolitan Transportation District (self-employed with income sourced from TriMet, which includes parts of Clackamas, Multnomah, and Washington counties; reported on separate state tax form TM)
- Other transit districts (businesses with income sourced from those transit districts; filed with transit districts or municipalities administering transit districts)

Pennsylvania:

- Most municipalities, including Pittsburgh and Allentown, and school districts (earned income only; local return must be filed by all residents of municipality or school district imposing local earned income tax with the local earned income tax collector, such as Berkheimer, Keystone Collections, or Jordan Tax Service; an additional local services tax, potentially refundable if income is below a certain threshold, is also imposed by some municipalities and school districts on earned income sourced from those municipalities and school districts; local earned income tax collectors, rates, and local service tax refund rules can be found on the Pennsylvania Municipal Statistics website)
- Philadelphia (earned and passive income; income must be reported to the City of Philadelphia if Philadelphia tax is not withheld by employer; residents must file the Earnings tax form to report wages on which Philadelphia income tax is not withheld, the Net Profits tax form to report self-employment, business, and most rental income, and the School Income tax to report passive income excluding interest earned from checking and savings accounts; an additional Business Income and Receipts Tax is also imposed on business income sourced from Philadelphia; individuals earning less than amount that would qualify them for the Pennsylvania income tax forgiveness program are eligible to receive a partial refund of their wage tax withheld by filing a refund application)

West Virginia:

- Some municipalities, including Charleston and Huntington (flat City Service fee for privilege of working or conducting business; filed with municipality imposing fee)

== Corporate income tax ==
State Corporate Taxes (2022)

Most states impose a tax on income of corporations having sufficient connection ("nexus") with the state. Such taxes apply to U.S. and foreign corporations, and are not subject to tax treaties. Such tax is generally based on business income of the corporation apportioned to the state plus nonbusiness income only of resident corporations. Most state corporate income taxes are imposed at a flat rate and have a minimum amount of tax. Business taxable income in most states is defined, at least in part, by reference to federal taxable income.

According to taxfoundation.org, these states have no state corporate income tax as of Feb 1, 2020: Nevada, Ohio, South Dakota, Texas, Washington, and Wyoming. However, Nevada, Ohio, and Washington impose a gross receipts tax while Texas has a franchise tax based on "taxable margin", generally defined as sales less either cost of goods sold less compensation, with complete exemption (no tax owed) for less than $1MM in annual earnings and gradually increasing to a maximum tax of 1% based on net revenue, where net revenue can be calculated in the most advantageous of four different ways.

=== Nexus ===
States are not permitted to tax income of a corporation unless four tests are met under Complete Auto Transit, Inc. v. Brady:

- There must be a "substantial nexus" (connection) between the taxpayer's activities and the state,
- The tax must not discriminate against interstate commerce,
- The tax must be fairly apportioned, and
- There must be a fair relationship to services provided.

Substantial nexus (referred to generally as simply "nexus") is a general U.S. Constitutional requirement that is subject to interpretation, generally by the state's comptroller or tax office, and often in administrative "letter rulings".

In the now-overturned Quill Corp. v. North Dakota the Supreme Court of the United States confirmed the holding of National Bellas Hess v. Illinois that a corporation or other tax entity must maintain a physical presence in the state (such as physical property, employees, officers) for the state to be able to require it to collect sales or use tax. The Supreme Court's physical presence requirement in Quill was likely limited to sales and use tax nexus, but the Court specifically stated that it was silent with respect to all other types of taxes ("Although we have not, in our review of other types of taxes, articulated the same physical-presence requirement that Bellas Hess established for sales and use taxes, that silence does not imply repudiation of the Bellas Hess rule."). Whether Quill applies to corporate income and similar taxes is a point of contention between states and taxpayers. The "substantial nexus" requirement of Complete Auto, supra, has been applied to corporate income tax by numerous state supreme courts.

=== Apportionment ===
The courts have held that the requirement for fair apportionment may be met by apportioning between jurisdictions all business income of a corporation based on a formula using the particular corporation's details. Many states use a three factor formula, averaging the ratios of property, payroll, and sales within the state to that overall. Some states weight the formula. Some states use a single factor formula based on sales.

== State capital gains taxes ==
Most states tax capital gains as ordinary income. Most states that do not tax income do not tax capital gains either, except Washington State, which does not tax ordinary income, but (beginning in 2021) taxes capital gains at 7%.

== History ==
The first state income tax, as the term is understood today in the United States, was passed by the State of Wisconsin in 1911 and came into effect in 1912. However, the idea of taxing income has a long history.

Some of the English colonies in North America taxed property (mostly farmland at that time) according to its assessed produce, rather than, as now, according to assessed resale value. Some of these colonies also taxed "faculties" of making income in ways other than farming, assessed by the same people who assessed property. These taxes taken together can be considered a sort of income tax. The records of no colony covered by Rabushka (the colonies that became part of the United States) separated the property and faculty components, and most records indicate amounts levied rather than collected, so much is unknown about the effectiveness of these taxes, up to and including whether the faculty part was actually collected at all.

Colonies with laws taxing both property and faculties
- Plymouth Colony from 1643 and Massachusetts Bay Colony from 1646, and after they merged, the Province of Massachusetts Bay until the Revolution;
- New Haven Colony from 1649 and Connecticut Colony from 1650, past the 1662 merger with New Haven, until the Revolution;
- the Colony of Rhode Island and Providence Plantations, arguably from 1673 to 1744 or later;
- the Province of West Jersey, a single 1684 law;
- the "South-west part" of the Province of Carolina, later the Province of South Carolina, from 1701 until the Revolution;
- the Province of New Hampshire, arguably from 1719 to 1772 or later;
- and the Delaware Colony in the Province of Pennsylvania, from 1752 to the Revolution.

Rabushka makes it clear that Massachusetts and Connecticut actually levied these taxes regularly, while for the other colonies such levies happened much less often; South Carolina levied no direct taxes from 1704 through 1713, for example. Becker, however, sees faculty taxes as routine parts of several colonies' finances, including Pennsylvania.

During and after the American Revolution, although property taxes were evolving toward the modern resale-value model, several states continued to collect faculty taxes.

States with faculty taxes
- Massachusetts until 1916 (when it was replaced by a quasi-modern classified individual income tax);
- Connecticut until 1819;
- South Carolina, where the tax edged closer to a modern income tax, until 1868;
- Delaware until 1796;
- Maryland from 1777 to 1780;
- Virginia from 1777 to 1782;
- New York, one 1778 levy;
- the Vermont Republic, then Vermont as a state, from 1778 to 1850;
- and Pennsylvania from 1782 to 1840 (when it was replaced by an individual income tax; Becker, as noted above, would date this tax earlier).

Between the enactment of the Constitution and 1840, no new general taxes on income appeared. In 1796, Delaware abolished its faculty tax, and in 1819 Connecticut followed suit. On the other hand, in 1835, Pennsylvania instituted a tax on bank dividends, paid by withholding, which by about 1900 produced half its total revenue.

Several states, mostly in the South, instituted taxes related to income in the 1840s; some of these claimed to tax total income, while others explicitly taxed only specific categories, these latter sometimes called classified income taxes. These taxes may have been spurred by the ideals of Jacksonian democracy, or by fiscal difficulties resulting from the Panic of 1837. None of these taxes produced much revenue, partly because they were collected by local elected officials.

Early state income taxes
- Pennsylvania from 1840 to 1871;
- Maryland from 1841 to 1850;
- Alabama from 1843 to 1884;
- Virginia from 1843 to 1926 (when it was replaced by a modern individual income tax);
- Florida from 1845 to 1855;
- and North Carolina from 1849 to 1921 (when it was replaced by a modern individual income tax).

The 1850s brought another few income tax abolitions: Maryland and Vermont in 1850, and Florida in 1855.

During the American Civil War and Reconstruction Era, when both the United States of America (1861-1871) and the Confederate States of America (1863-1865) instituted income taxes, so did several states.

Civil War and Reconstruction state income taxes
- Texas from 1863 to 1871;
- Missouri from 1861 to 1865;
- Georgia from 1863 to 1866;
- West Virginia in 1863 only;
- Louisiana from 1865 to 1899;
- and Kentucky from 1867 to 1872.

As with the national taxes, these were made in various ways to produce substantial revenue, for the first time in the history of American income taxation. On the other hand, as soon as the war ended, a wave of abolitions began: Missouri in 1865, Georgia in 1866, South Carolina in 1868, Pennsylvania and Texas in 1871, and Kentucky in 1872.

The rest of the century balanced new taxes with abolitions: Delaware levied a tax on several classes of income in 1869, then abolished it in 1871; Tennessee instituted a tax on dividends and bond interest in 1883, but Kinsman reports that by 1903 it had produced zero actual revenue; Alabama abolished its income tax in 1884; South Carolina instituted a new one in 1897 (eventually abolished in 1918); and Louisiana abolished its income tax in 1899.

Following the 1895 Supreme Court decision in Pollock v. Farmers' Loan & Trust Co. which effectively ended a federal income tax, some more states instituted their own along the lines established in the 19th century:

Old-fashioned state income taxes
- Oklahoma 1908 to 1915;
- Mississippi 1912 to 1924;
- Missouri, individual and corporate, from 1917.

However, other states, some perhaps spurred by Populism, some certainly by Progressivism, instituted taxes incorporating various measures long used in Europe, but considerably less common in America, such as withholding, corporate income taxation (as against earlier taxes on corporate capital), and especially the defining feature of a "modern" income tax, central administration by bureaucrats rather than local elected officials. The twin revenue-raising successes of Wisconsin's 1911 (the Wisconsin Income Tax, the first "modern" State Income Tax was passed in 1911 and came into effect in 1912) and the United States' 1914 income taxes prompted imitation. Note that writers on the subject sometimes distinguish between corporate "net income" taxes, which are straightforward corporate income taxes, and corporate "franchise" taxes, which are taxes levied on corporations for doing business in a state, sometimes based on net income. Many states' constitutions were interpreted as barring direct income taxation, and franchise taxes were seen as legal ways to evade these bars. The term "franchise tax" has nothing to do with the voting franchise, and franchise taxes only apply to individuals insofar as they do business. Note that some states actually levy both corporate net income taxes and corporate franchise taxes based on net income. For the following list, see and.

Progressive Era state income taxes
- The Territory of Hawaii, then Hawaii as a state, individual and corporate from 1901 (this is sometimes claimed as the oldest state income tax; it is certainly the oldest state corporate income tax);
- Wisconsin, individual and corporate from 1911 (generally considered the first modern state income tax, built on a law largely written by Delos Kinsman, whose 1903 book on the subject is cited above; its major distinction as against older laws, including Hawaii's, is that state bureaucrats rather than local assessors collected it);
- Connecticut, franchise, from 1915;
- Oklahoma, modernisation of existing individual tax, from 1915;
- Massachusetts, individual, from 1916;
- Virginia, corporate, from 1916;
- Delaware, individual, from 1917;
- Montana, franchise, from 1917;
- New York, franchise, from 1917;
- Note abolition of South Carolina's non-modern individual income tax in 1918;
- Alabama, individual, 1919, declared unconstitutional 1920;
- New Mexico, individual and corporate, 1919, apparently abolished soon thereafter;
- New York, individual, from 1919;
- North Dakota, individual and corporate, from 1919;
- Massachusetts, corporate (franchise), from 1919 or 1920;
- Mississippi's income tax was held to apply to corporations in 1921;
- North Carolina, modernisation of existing individual and institution of corporate taxes, from 1921;
- South Carolina, individual and corporate, from 1921 or 1922;
- New Hampshire, "intangibles" (restricted to interest and dividends), from 1923;
- Oregon, individual and corporate, 1923 (repealed 1924);
- Tennessee, corporate, from 1923;
- Mississippi, modernisation of existing corporate and individual taxes, from 1924;
- Virginia, modernisation of existing corporate and individual taxes, from 1926.

This period coincided with the United States' acquisition of colonies, or dependencies: the Philippines, Puerto Rico, and Guam from Spain in the Spanish–American War, 1898–99; American Samoa by agreements with local leaders, 1899-1904; the Panama Canal Zone by agreement from Panama in 1904; and the U.S. Virgin Islands purchased from Denmark in 1917. (Arguably, Alaska, purchased from Russia in 1867, and Hawaii, annexed in 1900, were also dependencies, but both were by 1903 "incorporated" in the U.S., which these others never have been.) The Panama Canal Zone was essentially a company town, but the others all began levying income taxes under American rule. (Puerto Rico already had an income tax much like a faculty tax, which remained in effect for a short time after 1898.)

Early territorial income taxes
- The Philippines and Puerto Rico, from 1913, by the same law that instituted the federal income tax; this law is ancestral to the modern independent Philippines' income tax as well; and
- The U.S. Virgin Islands, from 1922.

A third of the current state individual income taxes, and still more of the current state corporate income taxes, were instituted during the decade after the Great Depression started:

Depression state income taxes
- Arkansas, individual and corporate, from 1929;
- California, franchise, from 1929;
- Georgia, individual and corporate, from 1929;
- Oregon, individual, franchise, and intangibles, from 1929, but the individual tax didn't take effect until 1930 and was restricted to use for property tax relief, and the intangibles tax was held unconstitutional in 1930;
- Tennessee, intangibles, from 1929;
- Idaho, individual and corporate, from 1931;
- Ohio, intangibles, from 1931, apparently abolished soon thereafter;
- Oklahoma, corporate, from 1931;
- Oregon, intangibles, 1931 to 1939;
- Utah, individual and franchise, from 1931;
- Vermont, individual and corporate, from 1931;
- Illinois, individual and corporate, 1932, soon declared unconstitutional;
- Washington, individual and corporate, 1932, declared unconstitutional 1933;
- Alabama, individual and corporate, from 1933;
- Arizona, individual and corporate, from 1933;
- Kansas, individual and corporate, from 1933;
- Minnesota, individual, corporate, and franchise, from 1933;
- Montana, individual and corporate, from 1933;
- New Mexico, individual and corporate, from 1933;
- Iowa, individual and franchise, from 1934;
- Louisiana, individual and corporate, from 1934;
- California, individual and corporate, from 1935;
- Pennsylvania, franchise, from 1935;
- South Dakota, individual and corporate, 1935 to 1943;
- The U.S. Virgin Islands income tax in 1935 became the first "mirror" tax, for which see below;
- Washington, individual and corporate, 1935, held unconstitutional in separate decisions the same year;
- West Virginia, individual, 1935 to 1942;
- Kentucky, individual and corporate, from 1936;
- Colorado, individual and corporate, from 1937;
- Maryland, individual and corporate, from 1937;
- District of Columbia, individual and either corporate or franchise, from 1939.

A "mirror" tax is a tax in a U.S. dependency in which the dependency adopts wholesale the U.S. federal income tax code, revising it by substituting the dependency's name for "United States" everywhere, and vice versa. The effect is that residents pay the equivalent of the federal income tax to the dependency, rather than to the U.S. government. Although mirroring formally came to an end with the Tax Reform Act of 1986, it remains the law as seen by the U.S. for Guam and the Northern Mariana Islands because conditions to its termination have not yet been met. In any event, the other mirror tax dependencies (the U.S. Virgin Islands and American Samoa) are free to continue mirroring if, and as much as, they wish.

The U.S. acquired one more dependency from Japan in World War II: the Trust Territory of the Pacific Islands.

Two states, South Dakota and West Virginia, abolished Depression-era income taxes in 1942 and 1943, but these were nearly the last abolitions. For about twenty years after World War II, new state income taxes appeared at a somewhat slower pace, and most were corporate net income or corporate franchise taxes:

Post-World War II state income taxes
- Rhode Island, corporate, from 1947;
- The Territory of Alaska, then Alaska as a state, individual and corporate, from 1949;
- Guam, mirror, from 1950;
- Pennsylvania, corporate, from 1951;
- Oregon removed the restriction of individual income tax funds to property tax relief in 1953;
- Delaware, corporate, from 1958;
- New Jersey, corporate, from 1958;
- Idaho, franchise, from 1959;
- Utah, corporate, from 1959;
- West Virginia, individual, from 1961;
- American Samoa, mirror, from 1963;
- Indiana, individual and corporate, from 1963;
- Wisconsin, franchise, from 1965.

As early as 1957 General Motors protested a proposed corporate income tax in Michigan with threats of moving manufacturing out of the state. However, Michigan led off the most recent group of new income taxes:

Great Society state income taxes
- Michigan, individual and corporate (this replacing a value-added tax), from 1967;
- Nebraska, individual and corporate, from 1967;
- Maryland, individual (added county withholding tax and non resident tax. Believes led to state being mainly a commuter state for work) 1967, Present
- West Virginia, corporate, from 1967;
- Connecticut, intangibles (but taxing capital gains and not interest), from 1969;
- Illinois, individual and corporate, from 1969;
- Maine, individual and corporate, from 1969;
- New Hampshire, corporate, from 1970;
- Florida, franchise, from 1971;
- Ohio, individual and corporate, from 1971;
- Pennsylvania, individual, from 1971;
- Rhode Island, individual, from 1971;
- The Trust Territory of the Pacific Islands, individual and corporate, from 1971.

In the early 1970s, Pennsylvania and Ohio competed for businesses with Ohio wooing industries with a reduced corporate income tax but Pennsylvania warning that Ohio had higher municipal taxes that included taxes on inventories, machinery and equipment.

A few more events of the 1970s follows:

Late 1970s state income taxes
- Michigan abolished its corporate income tax in 1975, replacing it with another value-added tax;
- New Jersey instituted an individual income tax in 1976;
- The Northern Mariana Islands negotiated with the U.S. in 1975 a mirror tax which was to go into effect in 1979, but in 1979 enacted a law rebating that tax partially or entirely each year and levying a simpler income tax;
- Alaska abolished its individual income tax retroactive to 1979 in 1980.

(Also during this time the U.S. began returning the Panama Canal Zone to Panama in 1979, and self-government, eventually to lead to independence, began between 1979 and 1981 in all parts of the Trust Territory of the Pacific Islands except for the Northern Mariana Islands. The resulting countries - the Marshall Islands, the Federated States of Micronesia, and Palau - all levy income taxes today.)

The only subsequent individual income tax instituted to date is Connecticut's, from 1991, replacing the earlier intangibles tax. The median family income in many of the state's suburbs was nearly twice that of families living in urban areas. Governor Lowell Weicker's administration imposed a personal income tax to address the inequities of the sales tax system, and implemented a program to modify state funding formulas so that urban communities received a larger share.

Numerous states with income taxes have considered measures to abolish those taxes since the Late-2000s recession began, and several states without income taxes have considered measures to institute them, but only one such proposal has been enacted: Michigan replaced its more recent value-added tax with a new corporate income tax in 2009.

== State individual income tax rates and brackets ==
State individual income tax rates & brackets (2025)
State	Single filer rates > Brackets	Married filing jointly rates > Brackets
Alabama	2% > $0	
	4% > $500	4% > $1,000
	5% > $3,000	5% > $6,000
Alaska	None	
Arizona	2.5% > $0	
Arkansas	2% > $0	
	3.9% > $4,500	
California	1% > $0	1% > $0
	2% > $10,756	2% > $21,512
	4% > $25,499	4% > $50,998
	6% > $40,245	6% > $80,490
	8% > $55,866	8% > $111,732
	9.3% > $70,606	9.3% > $141,732
	10.3% > $360,659	10.3% > $721,318
	11.3% > $432,787	11.3% > $865,574
	12.3% > $721,314	12.3% > $1,000,000
	13.3% > $1,000,000	13.3% > $1,442,628
Colorado	4.4% > $0	
Connecticut	2% > $0	
	4.5% > $10,000	4.5% > $20,000
	5.5% > $50,000	5.5% > $100,000
	6% > $100,000	6% > $200,000
	6.5% > $200,000	6.5% > $400,000
	6.9% > $250,000	6.9% > $500,000
	6.99% > $500,000	6.99% > $1,000,000
Delaware	2.2% > $2,000	
	3.9% > $5,000	
	4.8% > $10,000	
	5.2% > $20,000	
	5.55% > $25,000	
	6.6% > $60,000	
Florida	None	
Georgia	5.39% > $0	
Hawaii	1.4% > $0	
	3.2% > $9,600	3.2% > $19,200
	5.5% > $14,400	5.5% > $28,800
	6.4% > $19,200	6.4% > $38,400
	6.8% > $24,000	6.8% > $48,000
	7.2% > $36,000	7.2% > $72,000
	7.6% > $48,000	7.6% > $96,000
	7.9% > $125,000	7.9% > $250,000
	8.25% > $175,000	8.25% > $350,000
	9% > $225,000	9% > $450,000
	10% > $275,000	10% > $550,000
	11% > $325,000	11% > $650,000
Idaho	5.695% > $4,673	5.695% > $9,346
Illinois	4.95% > $0	
Indiana	3% > $0	
Iowa	3.8% > $0	
Kansas	5.2% > $0	
	5.58% > $23,000	5.58% > $46,000
Kentucky	4% > $0	
Louisiana	3% > $0	
Maine	5.8% > $0	
	6.75% > $26,800	6.75% > $53,600
	7.15% > $63,450	7.15% > $126,900
Maryland	2% > $0	
	3% > $1,000	
	4% > $2,000	
	4.75% > $3,000	
	5% > $100,000	5% > $150,000
	5.25% > $125,000	5.25% > $175,000
	5.5% > $150,000	5.5% > $225,000
	5.75% > $250,000	5.75% > $300,000
Massachusetts	5% > $0	
	9% > $1,083,150	
Michigan	4.25% > $0	
Minnesota	5.35% > $0	
	6.8% > $32,570	6.8% > $47,620
	7.85% > $106,990	7.85% > $189,180
	9.85% > $198,630	9.85% > $330,410
Mississippi	4.4% > $10,000	
Missouri	2% > $1,313	
	2.5% > $2,626	
	3% > $3,939	
	3.5% > $5,252	
	4% > $6,565	
	4.5% > $7,878	
	4.7% > $9,191	
Montana	4.7% > $0	
	5.9% > $21,100	5.9% > $42,200
Nebraska	2.46% > $0	
	3.51% > $4,030	3.51% > $8,040
	5.01% > $24,120	5.01% > $48,250
	5.2% > $38,870	5.2% > $77,730
Nevada	None	
New Hampshire	None	
New Jersey	1.4% > $0	
	1.75% > $20,000	
		2.45% > $50,000
	3.5% > $35,000	3.5% > $70,000
	5.525% > $40,000	5.525% > $80,000
	6.37% > $75,000	6.37% > $150,000
	8.97% > $500,000	
	10.75% > $1,000,000	
New Mexico	1.5% > $0	
	3.2% > $5,500	3.2% > $8,000
	4.3% > $16,500	4.3% > $25,000
	4.7% > $33,500	4.7% > $50,000
	4.9% > $66,500	4.9% > $100,000
	5.9% > $210,000	5.9% > $315,500
New York	4% > $0	
	4.5% > $8,500	4.5% > $17,150
	5.25% > $11,700	5.25% > $23,600
	5.5% > $13,900	5.5% > $27,900
	6% > $80,650	6% > $161,550
	6.85% > $215,400	6.85% > $323,200
	9.65% > $1,077,550	9.65% > $2,155,350
	10.3% > $5,000,000	
	10.9% > $25,000,000	
North Carolina	4.25% > $0	
North Dakota	1.95% > $48,475	1.95% > $80,975
	2.5% > $244,825	2.5% > $298,075
Ohio	2.75% > $26,050	
Oklahoma	0.25% > $0	
	0.75% > $1,000	0.75% > $2,000
	1.75% > $2,500	1.75% > $5,000
	2.75% > $3,750	2.75% > $7,500
	3.75% > $4,900	3.75% > $9,800
	4.75% > $7,200	4.75% > $14,400
Oregon	4.75% > $0	
	6.75% > $4,400	6.75% > $8,800
	8.75% > $11,050	8.75% > $22,100
	9.9% > $125,000	9.9% > $250,000
Pennsylvania	3.07% > $0	
Rhode Island	3.75% > $0	
	4.75% > $79,900	
	5.99% > $181,650	
South Carolina	0% > $0	
	3% > $3,560	
	6.2% > $17,830	
South Dakota	None	
Tennessee	None	
Texas	None	
Utah	4.55% > $0	
Vermont	3.35% > $0	
	6.6% > $47,900	6.6% > $79,950
	7.6% > $116,000	7.6% > $193,300
	8.75% > $242,000	8.75% > $294,600
Virginia	2% > $0	
	3% > $3,000	
	5% > $5,000	
	5.75% > $17,000	
Washington	None	
West Virginia	2.22% > $0	
	2.96% > $10,000	
	3.33% > $25,000	
	4.44% > $40,000	
	4.82% > $60,000	
Wisconsin	3.5% > $0	3.5% > $0
	4.4% > $14,680	4.4% > $19,580
	5.3% > $29,370	5.3% > $39,150
	7.65% > $323,290	7.65% > $431,060
Wyoming	None	
Washington, D.C.	4% > $0	
	6% > $10,000	
	6.5% > $40,000	
	8.5% > $60,000	
	9.25% > $250,000	
	9.75% > $500,000	
	10.75% > $1,000,000	

== State corporate tax rates and brackets ==
State corporate tax rates (2025)
State	Brackets
Alabama	6.5% > $0
Alaska	0% > $0
	2% > $25,000
	3% > $49,000
	4% > $74,000
	5% > $99,000
	6% > $124,000
	7% > $148,000
	8% > $173,000
	9% > $198,000
	9.4% > $222,000
Arizona	4.9% > $0
Arkansas	1% > $0
	2% > $3,000
	3% > $5,000
	4.3% > $11,000
California	8.84% > $0
Colorado	4.4% > $0
Connecticut	7.5% > $0
	8.25% > $100,000,000
Delaware	8.7% > $0
Florida	5.5% > $50,000
Georgia	5.39% > $0
Hawaii	4.4% > $0
	5.4% > $25,000
	6.4% > $100,000
Idaho	5.695% > $0
Illinois	9.5% > $0
Indiana	4.9% > $0
Iowa	5.5% > $0
	7.1% > $100,000
Kansas	3.5% > $0
	6.5% > $50,000
Kentucky	5% > $0
Louisiana	5.5% > $0
Maine	3.5% > $0
	7.93% > $350,000
	8.33% > $1,050,000
	8.93% > $3,500,000
Maryland	8.25% > $0
Massachusetts	8% > $0
Michigan	6% > $0
Minnesota	9.8% > $0
Mississippi	4% > $5,000
	5% > $10,000
Missouri	4% > $0
Montana	6.75% > $0
Nebraska	5.2% > $0
Nevada	Gross Receipts Tax
New Hampshire	7.5% > $0
New Jersey	6.5% > $0
	7.5% > $50,000
	9% > $100,000
	11.5% > $1,000,000
New Mexico	5.9% > $0
New York	6.5% > $0
	7.25% > $5,000,000
North Carolina	2.25% > $0
North Dakota	1.41% > $0
	3.55% > $25,000
	4.31% > $50,000
Ohio	Gross Receipts Tax
Oklahoma	4% > $0
Oregon	6.6% > $0
	7.6% > $1,000,000
Pennsylvania	7.99% > $0
Rhode Island	7% > $0
South Carolina	5% > $0
South Dakota	None
Tennessee	6.5% > $0
Texas	Gross Receipts Tax
Utah	4.55% > $0
Vermont	6% > $0
	7% > $10,000
	8.5% > $25,000
Virginia	6% > $0
Washington	Gross Receipts Tax
West Virginia	6.5% > $0
Wisconsin	7.9% > $0
Wyoming	None
Washington, D.C.	8.25% > $0

== See also ==
- Income tax in the United States
- Jock tax
- State tax levels in the United States
- Taxation in the United States
- State Sales Tax
- U.S. State Non-resident Withholding Tax
