= U.S. State Non-resident Withholding Tax =

U.S. State Nonresident Withholding Tax is a mandatory prepayment of tax of individuals or entities that are not resident in the state. A common example of this is the taxation of oil and natural gas royalty interest revenue. In order to ensure that the state receives a portion of the revenue from oil and gas leases within the state, any payments made to an address outside of the state require that a tax be withheld and paid directly to the state.

States that have enacted such laws include, but are not limited to:

- Georgia
- Maryland
- Oklahoma
- New Mexico
- Utah
- California
- Oregon
- Montana
- North Carolina
- Wisconsin

A majority of states with income taxes impose similar requirements on partnerships (including LLCs) and S corporations with nonresident partners or shareholders. All states with income taxes impose a similar withholding obligation on wages paid to nonresidents by businesses operating within the state.

The taxes withheld must be treated as prepaid taxes, with final taxes imposed at the same rate and under the same computations for residents and nonresidents.

== Sample of external links ==
- Georgia Department of Revenue - Withholding
- Oklahoma tax form for reporting
- Oregon nonresident withholding on certain real estate transactions
