= Coal Bluff Campground and Park =

Campground and recreation area in Mississippi, US

Coordinates: 32°35′17″N 89°46′47″W

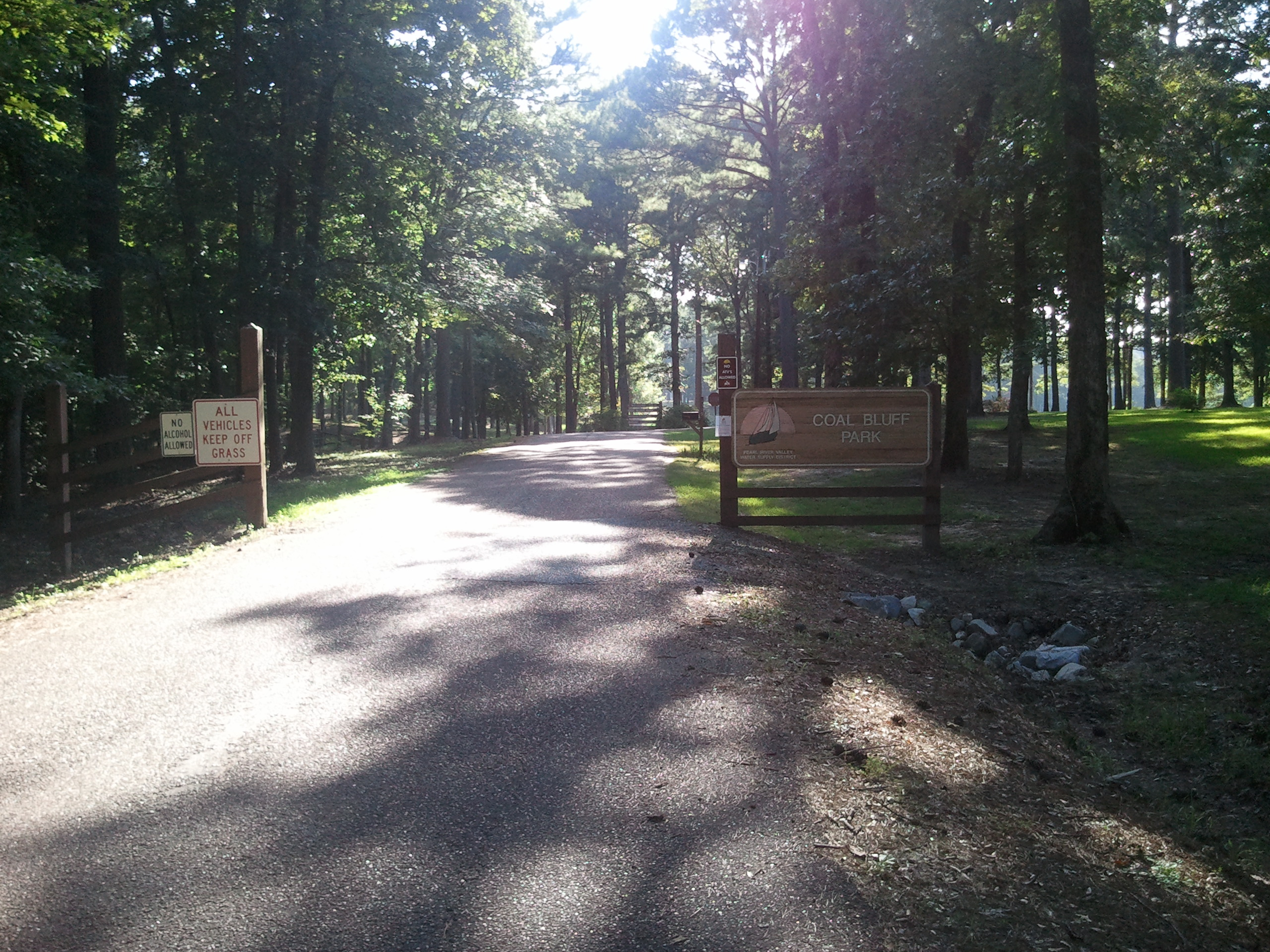
Entrance to the park and campground.

Coal Bluff Campground and Park is a semi-private campground and recreation area located along the Pearl River in Scott County, Mississippi, near the community of Ludlow. The area is managed by Pearl River Valley Water Supply District (PRVWSD).

== History ==
The name "Coal Bluff" comes from the mineral lignite, or "brown coal", commonly found in the area.

== Recreation ==
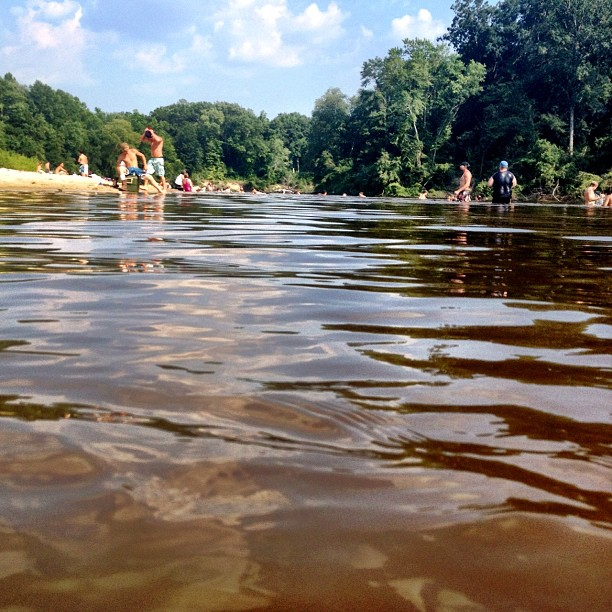
Bathers in the river along a sandbar where the park's nature trail terminates. Swimming/sunbathing on the river is a popular summertime activity.

The campground and park offers a variety of outdoor recreation opportunities, including camping, biking/hiking, water sports and nature viewing.

=== Camping ===
The campground accommodates both primitive and R.V. campers for a nightly or monthly fee that includes graded and cement camping pads with utility hook-ups for electricity, water and sewer. Campground amenities include bath houses, a playground, and a swimming pool. A pavilion overlooking the river is available to rent for large gatherings.

=== Nature viewing ===
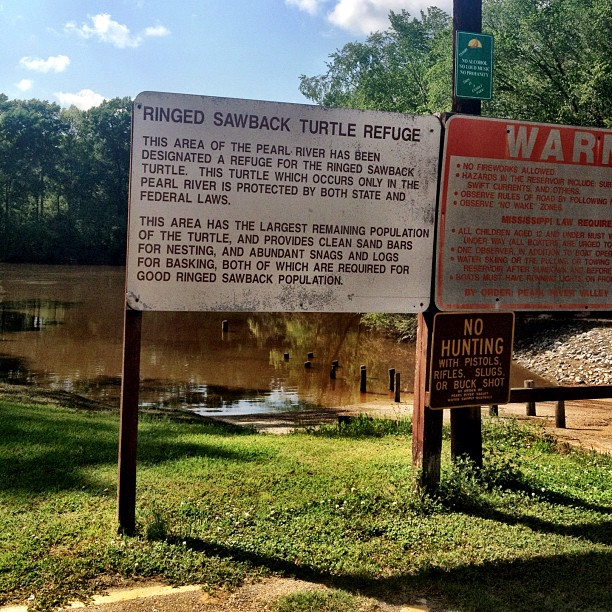
A sign at the public boat launch and nature trail entrance notifying visitors of the presence of endangered ringed sawback turtles.

A nature trail along the river offers viewing of native plant and animal species, including bald cypress swamp forests, American alligators, numerous water fowl, and the endangered ringed sawback turtle.

=== Water sports ===
The park adjacent to the campground offers a free public boat launch into the river and a managed fishing pond. All manners of water craft can be found on the river, including motorboats, jet skis, canoes and kayaks. Large sandbars along the riverbanks are popular gathering places for boaters to swim and sunbath.

== Rules and regulations ==
The campground has set rules for visitors posted on-site and on-line, including speed limits, quiet hours, vehicle restrictions, etc. A 24-hour security guard patrols the campground and park. Parking restrictions at the public boat launch are enforced by the Reservoir Police. The municipality in which the park and campground are located, as well as the corresponding section of river, is designated as being within a dry county, meaning that possession of alcohol intended for consumption is illegal. Anyone caught littering can face a steep fine. Dumpsters and trash pickup are offered in both the park and campground. Trash service has been discontinued along the river, so people using the sandbars are expected to "pack-out" their own trash or face a fine for littering. Reservoir Police regularly patrol the area, both on land and by boat.
