= Fannegusha Creek =

Fannegusha Creek may refer to:

- Fannegusha Creek (Pearl River tributary), a stream in Mississippi
- Fannegusha Creek (Tchula Lake tributary), a stream in Mississippi
- Fannegusha Creek (Blissdale Swamp tributary), a stream in Mississippi
