= Shadrick McAfee =

American football player and coach (born 1974)

Profile
- Position: Running back

Personal information
- Born: September 22, 1974 (age 52); Philadelphia, Mississippi
- Listed height: 5 ft 9 in (1.75 m)
- Listed weight: 203 lb (92 kg)

Career information
- High school: Philadelphia High School (Mississippi)
- College: Central Arkansas
- NFL draft: 2001: undrafted

Career history

Playing
- New Orleans Thunder (1999); New York Jets (2001)*; Edmonton Eskimos (2001)*; Lafayette Roughnecks (2001); Lake Charles Land Sharks (2002); Southwest Louisiana Swashbucklers (2003); Bossier City Battlewings (2004); Louisiana Swashbucklers (2005)
- * Offseason or practice squad member only

Coaching
- Louisiana Swashbucklers (2009, head coach)
- Stats at ArenaFan.com

Shadrick "Mac" McAfee (born September 22, 1974) is the former head coach of the Louisiana Swashbucklers, and a former player of several professional leagues.

== Career ==
McAfee attended Philadelphia High School in Mississippi. He played college football at NCAA Division II Mississippi College, and after two years transferred to the University of Central Arkansas. In 1998, he was named all Gulf South Conference at running back.

Professionally, McAfee spent time with teams of the National Football League, Canadian Football League, Regional Football League, Arena Football League 2, National Indoor Football League, Intense Football League, and Indoor Football League. He played running back, wide receiver, defensive back, linebacker, and kick returner in his career.

== Personal ==
McAfee is one of several family members that played professional sports. A few of notable family members that played professional sports are Marcus Dupree (NFL, USFL, WWE,) Fred McAfee (NFL-New Orleans Saints, Pittsburgh Steelers, Arizona Cardinals, Tampa Bay Bucs), Tyrone Rush ( NFL- Washington Redskins, CFL-Montreal Alouettes, EFL Bergamo Lions), Pashen Thompson (ABL-Columbus Conquest, US Olympic Team)
