= Alampa Creek =

Stream in Mississippi, USA

Alampa Creek Tributary to Pinishook Creek
- Location of Alampas Creek mouth Alampa Creek (the United States)

Location
- Country: United States
- State: Mississippi
- County: Winston

Physical characteristics
- Source: Little Creek divide
  - location: about 6 miles northwest of Plattsburg, Mississippi
  - coordinates: 32°57′47″N 89°14′34″W
  - elevation: 542 ft (165 m)
- Mouth: Pinishook Creek
  - location: about 2 miles north of Plattsburg, Mississippi
  - coordinates: 32°57′49″N 89°11′36″W
  - elevation: 446 ft (136 m)
- Length: 4.06 mi (6.53 km)
- Basin size: 4.76 square miles (12.3 km^{2})
- Discharge
  - location: Pinishook Creek
  - average: 7.35 cu ft/s (0.208 m^{3}/s) at mouth with Pinishook Creek

Basin features
- Progression: Pinishook Creek → Pearl River → Lake Borgne → → Gulf of Mexico
- River system: Pearl River
- Tributaries
  - left: unnamed tributaries
  - right: unnamed tributaries
- Bridges: Walter Sisson Road, Plattsburg-Mt. Calvery Road

Alampa Creek is a stream in the U.S. state of Mississippi. It is a tributary to Pinishook Creek.

Alampa most likely is a name derived from the Choctaw language meaning "hiding places".

== Course ==
Alampa Creek rises about 6 miles northwest of Plattsburg, Mississippi, and then flows generally east to join Pinishook Creek about 2 miles north of Plattsburg.

== Watershed ==
Alampas Creek drains 4.76 square miles (12.3 km^{2}) of area, receives about 57.6 in/year of precipitation, has a wetness index of 458.37, and is about 50% forested.
