= Pellaphalia Creek =

Pellaphalia Creek may refer to:

- Pellaphalia Creek (Leake County, Mississippi)
- Pellaphalia Creek (Leake and Madison counties, Mississippi)
