= Philadelphia High School =

Philadelphia High School may refer to the following schools in the United States:

- Philadelphia High School (Mississippi)
- Philadelphia High School for the Creative and Performing Arts, Philadelphia, Pennsylvania
- Philadelphia High School for Girls, Philadelphia, Pennsylvania
