= Alidade Creek =

Stream in Idaho, USA

Alidade Creek Tributary to Johnson Creek
- Location of Alidade Creek mouth Alidade Creek (the United States)

Location
- Country: United States
- State: Idaho
- County: Elmore

Physical characteristics
- Source: Little Queens River divide
  - location: about 6 miles west-southwest of Rock Island Lake
  - coordinates: 43°48′35″N 115°09′47″W
  - elevation: 11,090 ft (3,380 m)
- Mouth: Johnson Creek
  - location: about 1 mile north of Tackobe Mountain
  - coordinates: 43°58′21″N 115°09′57″W
  - elevation: 6,624 ft (2,019 m)
- Length: 1.76 mi (2.83 km)
- Basin size: 0.84 square miles (2.2 km^{2})
- Discharge
  - location: Johnson Creek
  - average: 1.54 cu ft/s (0.044 m^{3}/s) at mouth with Pinishook Creek

Basin features
- Progression: Johnson Creek → North Fork Boise River → Boise River → Snake River → Columbia River → Pacific Ocean
- River system: Boise River
- Tributaries
  - left: unnamed tributaries
  - right: unnamed tributaries
- Waterbodies: Alidade Lake
- Bridges: none

Alidade Creek is a stream in the U.S. state of Idaho. It is a tributary of Johnson Creek.

Alidade Creek was named after the alidade, a surveying instrument.
