= Coal Bluff =

Coal Bluff may refer to:

- Coal Bluff, Indiana
- Coal Bluff Campground and Park in Scott County, Mississippi
