= Neshoba Central High School =

Public school in Mississippi, US

Coordinates: 32.7673°N 89.0933°W

Location
- 1123 Golf Course Road; Philadelphia, Mississippi, Neshoba County 39350

Information
- School type: Public
- School district: Neshoba County School District
- NCES District ID: 2803060
- Superintendent: Josh Perkins
- NCES School ID: 280306000612
- Principal: Jason B. Gentry
- Grades: 9-12
- Enrollment: 908
- Student to teacher ratio: 14.46
- Athletics conference: 6A
- Mascot: Rocket
- Website: https://nchs.neshobacentral.com/

Neshoba Central High School is a public school in Philadelphia, Mississippi. It is part of the Neshoba County School District. It is located at 1123 Golf Course Road.

In 2025 the school's student body was almost 60 percent white, 20 percent black, 13 percent Native American and 8 percent mixed. Sixty percent of students were categorized as economically disadvantaged. Philadelphia High School, in the same city, was about 90 percent black in 2025.

Rockets are the school mascot. It competes in the 6A division. The football team was established in 1960 and has won several district titles but no state championships. As of 2025, it has played 57 times against Philadelphia High School.

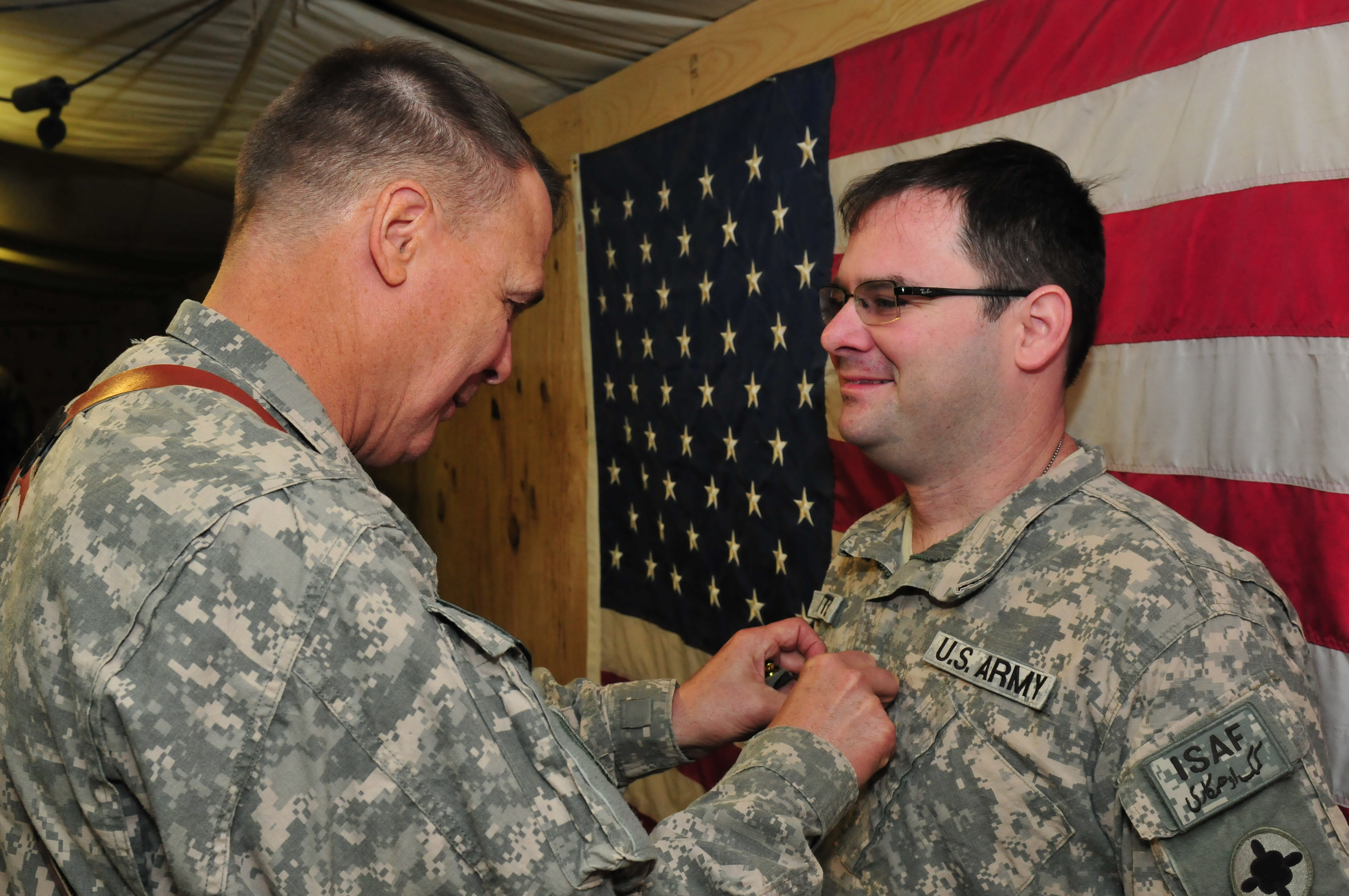
A Neshoba Central grad serving in the Mississippi National Guard is promoted to staff sergeant

Prentice Copeland was the principal during desegregation. County School Superintendent T. C. Ward said, "If there was a single white person in the county who wanted integration I don't know who that person is, and when the Supreme Court decision came in 1954 nobody thought the courts would enforce it here."In 1965 the county began desegregating its schools and ten African American children attended Neshoba Central School. A white student who poked a black student was paddled by the principal who reported no further problems.

In 2024 its performing arts center opened.

== Alumni ==
- Hardy (singer)
- Jarquez Hunter, football running back
- David Goforth
- Lane Taylor (politician)
- Tim Edwards (gridiron football)
- Derrick Hoskins
- Tyrone Rush
- Tim Edwards, football player

== See also ==
- List of high schools in Mississippi
