= Mule Jail Lake =

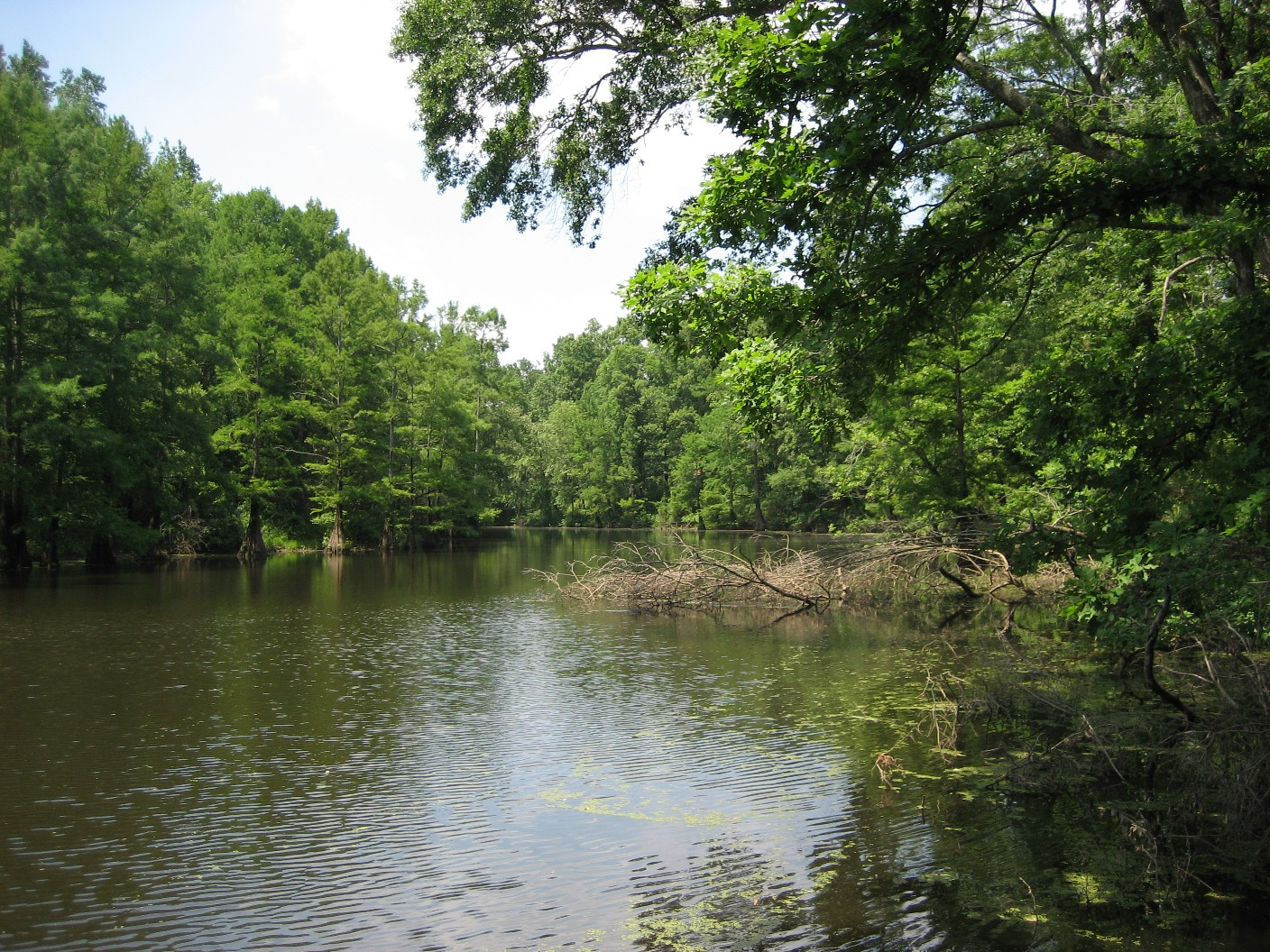
- Mule Jail Lake

- Location within Mississippi Location within the United States
- Location: Hinds County and Rankin County, Mississippi
- Coordinates: 32°23′43″N 90°4′45″W
- Type: oxbow lake
- Basin countries: United States
- Surface elevation: 259 ft (79 m)

Mule Jail Lake is an oxbow lake located in Rankin County and in Hinds County, Mississippi, United States.

Mule Jail is bounded to the north by the Ross Barnett Reservoir, to the east and south by the Pearl River, and to the west by the Jackson Country Club.

One of the oldest cypress trees in Mississippi is located at the lake, and a hunting and fishing club is also located there.

The Mule Jail Mountain Bike Trail, part of the Ross Barnett Reservoir trail network, meanders near the lake.

== Legend ==
The legend associated with Mule Jail Lake varies from family to family, but in general, Mule Jail Lake received its name from the one-time island that is central to the oxbow lake. During the American Civil War, as the Union army moved through the Jackson area, farmers gathered as many of their livestock as possible and moved them to this island and cut all access to the island. Thus many animals were spared possible slaughter.
