= Bogue Chitto, Mississippi =

- Census-designated place
- Location of Bogue Chitto, Mississippi

- Location in the United States
- Coordinates: 32°49′47″N 88°55′12″W
- Country: United States
- State: Mississippi
- Counties: Neshoba, Kemper

Area
  - Total: 6.39 sq mi (16.55 km^{2})
  - Land: 6.35 sq mi (16.44 km^{2})
  - Water: 0.046 sq mi (0.12 km^{2})
- Elevation: 486 ft (148 m)

Population (2020)
  - Total: 864
  - Density: 136.2/sq mi (52.57/km^{2})
- Time zone: UTC-6 (Central (CST))
  - Summer (DST): UTC-5 (CDT)
- FIPS code: 28-07330
- GNIS ID: 685013

Bogue Chitto is a census-designated place (CDP) situated in Kemper and Neshoba counties, Mississippi. The population was 864 at the 2020 census. It is part of the Mississippi Band of Choctaw Indians Reservation and the population is 93% Choctaw.

== History ==
During Freedom Summer of 1964 and a voter registration drive, three civil rights workers: James Chaney, Andrew Goodman and Michael Schwerner, were killed by Ku Klux Klan members about 10 miles north of Bogue Chitto on the night of June 21, 1964. Their bodies were discovered by the FBI and other law enforcement, buried in an earthen dam on the Old Jolly Farm in Neshoba County, Mississippi in August 1964. The murders galvanized national attention and contributed to passage of the Voting Rights Act of 1965. The events were the subject of the 1988 drama film Mississippi Burning.

== Etymology ==
The name Bogue Chitto, meaning "Big Creek," comes from the Choctaw words "bok" (creek) and "chito" (big).

== Geography ==
Much of the Mississippi Choctaw Indian Reservation is in Neshoba County with a portion extending into western Kemper County. Bogue Chitto is one of 8 communities in the nation.

According to the United States Census Bureau, the CDP has a total area of 6.3 square miles (16.4 km^{2}), of which 6.3 square miles (16.3 km^{2}) are land and 0.04 square mile (0.1 km^{2}) (0.63%) is water.

== Demographics ==
Historical population
Census	Pop.	Note	%±
2020	864		—
U.S. Decennial Census

Bogue Chitto was first listed as a census designated place in the 2020 U.S. census.

=== Racial and ethnic composition ===
Bogue Chitto CDP, Mississippi – Racial and ethnic composition Note: the US Census treats Hispanic/Latino as an ethnic category. This table excludes Latinos from the racial categories and assigns them to a separate category. Hispanics/Latinos may be of any race.
Race / Ethnicity (NH = Non-Hispanic)	Pop 2020	2020
White alone (NH)	49	5.67%
Black or African American alone (NH)	36	4.17%
Native American or Alaska Native alone (NH)	731	84.61%
Asian alone (NH)	0	0.00%
Native Hawaiian or Pacific Islander alone (NH)	0	0.00%
Other race alone (NH)	0	0.00%
Mixed race or Multiracial (NH)	33	3.82%
Hispanic or Latino (any race)	15	1.74%
Total	864	100.00%

=== 2020 census ===
As of the 2020 United States census, there were 864 people, 114 households, and 92 families residing in the CDP.

As of the census of 2000, there were 533 people, 160 households, and 127 families residing in the CDP. The population density was 84.6 inhabitants per square mile (32.7/km^{2}). There were 169 housing units at an average density of 26.8 units per square mile (10.3 units/km^{2}). The racial makeup of the CDP was 5.82% White, 0.38% African American, 92.68% Native American, and 1.13% from two or more races. Hispanic or Latino comprised 0.38% of the population.

There were 160 households, out of which 40.6% had children under the age of 18 living with them, 31.9% were married couples living together, 31.9% had a female householder with no husband present, and 20.6% were non-families. 11.9% of all households were made up of individuals, and 3.1% had someone living alone who was 65 years of age or older. The average household size was 3.33 and the average family size was 3.48.

In the CDP, the population was spread out, with 34.1% under the age of 18, 11.1% from 18 to 24, 31.0% from 25 to 44, 16.9% from 45 to 64, and 6.9% who were 65 years of age or older. The median age was 28 years. For every 100 females, there were 94.5 males. For every 100 females age 18 and over, there were 86.7 males.

The median income for a household in the CDP was $18,641, and the median income for a family was $16,597. Males had a median income of $18,250 versus $15,240 for females. The per capita income for the CDP was $6,080. About 56.1% of families and 54.2% of the population were below the poverty line, including 58.3% of those under age 18 and 80.6% of those age 65 or over.

== Education ==
The Neshoba County portion of Bogue Chitto is served by the Neshoba County School District. The Kemper County School District serves the portion of Bogue Chitto that lies in Kemper County.

Native American students are eligible to attend schools in the Choctaw Tribal School System, which is operated by the Mississippi Band of Choctaw Indians. Bogue Chitto Elementary School is in the community.

East Central Community College is the community college of Neshoba County. East Mississippi Community College is the community college of Kemper County.

== Notable people ==
- The Hodges Brothers, bluegrass quartet
