= Pearl River Valley Water Supply District =

Governing entity in Mississippi, U.S.

The Pearl River Valley Water Supply District (PRVWSD) is a governing entity within the state of Mississippi tasked to manage a portion of the Pearl River basin, including the Ross Barnett Reservoir area, and its watersheds. The responsibilities of the district include: overseeing land management, maintaining natural resources, and providing recreational opportunities.

== History ==
In 1956 the Pearl River Industrial Commission was authorized by the Mississippi State Legislature to study the feasibility of development along the Pearl River basin near Jackson, Mississippi, primarily the creation of a reservoir through the construction of a spillway and dam. A hearing on the proposed development was heard by the State Board of Water Commissioners, as well as the Boards of Supervisors within the proposed district, and found that the project was a public necessity to compensate for the increasing demand for potable water (PEER report #471, 2004, page 3). As a result of that finding, the Pearl River Valley Water Supply District (PRVWSD) was created in 1958 to oversee construction and future management of the Pearl River Reservoir (later named the Ross Barnett Reservoir), its watersheds, and surrounding land. The reservoir project was completed 1965 following the construction of an impoundment of the Pearl River bordering Rankin and Madison counties. The funding for the reservoir's construction was secured through bonds, which were to be paid off, in part, by taxes collected from municipalities within the newly formed district, as well as the city of Jackson, which would be drawing drinking water from the reservoir. The construction bonds were paid-off in 1992, and, since that time, the district no longer collects taxes, rather relying primarily on annual lease fees from residential and commercial properties within the district for funding.

== Governance ==
The PRVWSD is tasked to govern a 45-mile-long water basin comprising the Ross Barnett Reservoir and portions of the Pearl River, as well as land within one-quarter mile from the shoreline. Counties with land in the district are Hinds, Leake, Madison, Rankin, and Scott. The district operates on a committee system, and is primarily funded through commercial and residential property leasing fees. Responsibilities of the district include:

- Monitoring water quality, and supplying drinking water to the district, as well as the City of Jackson.
- Monitoring the reservoir dam and spillway
- Providing law enforcement within the district
- Flood control
- Land management of contained forestland, as well as leased commercial and residential properties
- Providing recreational opportunities

=== Organization ===
The district is governed by a 14-member board as follows.

- Five county representatives; one from each of the five counties within the district, appointed by their respective Boards of Supervisors
- Five members of the Pearl River Industrial Commission; one from each of the five counties within the district
- One member from the Mississippi Department of Environmental Quality.
- One member from the Mississippi Forestry Commission
- One member from the Mississippi Department of Health
- One Member from the Mississippi Department of Wildlife, Fisheries and Parks

=== Water supply and quality ===
The Ross Barnett Reservoir was created largely to compensate for the growing demand for drinking water in the area. The PRVWSD is tasked to maintain the environmental quality of the water supply as one aspect of their management program. Water quality tests are conducted frequently, as well as surveys of silting in the upper reservoir.

The PRVWSD also monitors and manages the distribution of invasive aquatic plants (macrophytes) in the reservoir. A five-year survey commissioned by the district, and headed by the Water Resources branch of Mississippi State University, studied the environmental impact of invasive plants in the reservoir. The survey identified fourteen invasive aquatic plants, Alligator weed being the most prevalent. The PRVWSD utilizes a number of methods to control the spread of invasive plants, including public education programs and the spraying of EPA approved herbicides.

==== City of Jackson ====
The Ross Barnett Reservoir serves as the primary source of drinking-water for Mississippi's nearby capital city, Jackson. A 1982 lawsuit was brought against the district by the city, successfully claiming that PRVWSD misappropriated tax collections from the city for purposes other than paying off the original reservoir construction bonds, including the funding of a district law enforcement agency. The bonds were paid off in 1992, and the district no longer collects taxes from the city.

=== Dam and spillway ===
The PRVWSD maintains a ten-gate spillway to control the lake level and discharge into the lower river. The steel gates are forty feet wide and twenty feet tall. The spillway is monitored 24-hours via a computer system and surveillance cameras located in the control tower situated on top of the dam. Computer software developed by the Mississippi Valley Division of the Corps of Engineers assist spillway operators in maintaining the correct discharge amount. The maximum output of the spillway is 170,000 cubic feet per second. The minimum discharge is 240 cubic feet per second.

==== Flood control ====
One aspect of the PRVWSD's management program is to mitigate flood events in the district, the upper river, and downstream.

Following the 1979 Easter flood, which left much of greater Jackson underwater, a report by the United States Comptroller's office found that the impact of the flood was due largely to a lack of communication between agencies. Since that time the Mississippi Valley Division of the Corps of Engineers, the City of Jackson, and the PRVWSD- as well as other involved agencies- have cooperated to develop an action plan in the event of another flood. There have also been numerous, highly debated, proposals over the years for additional flood control measures, both upstream and below the dam, but specific projects have yet to be approved.

=== Law enforcement ===
The PRVWSD operates a law enforcement agency within the district. The Reservoir Police patrol roadways, waterways, and commercial and residential areas within the district. They cooperate closely with other law enforcement agencies of the surrounding municipalities, and are fully authorized by the State of Mississippi to operate as a branch of law enforcement.

=== Leasing and land management ===
The district leases shoreline property for commercial and residential development, and relies on lease fees to provide the majority of district funding. According to the PRVWSD website, approximately 5,300 leases are in currently place.

=== Recreation ===
PRVWSD manages 22 boat launches, 16 parks, 5 campgrounds, 3 handicapped accessible trails, and 2 multipurpose trails. Recreation areas are used by an estimated 2.5 million visitors each year.
