= Ross Barnett Reservoir =

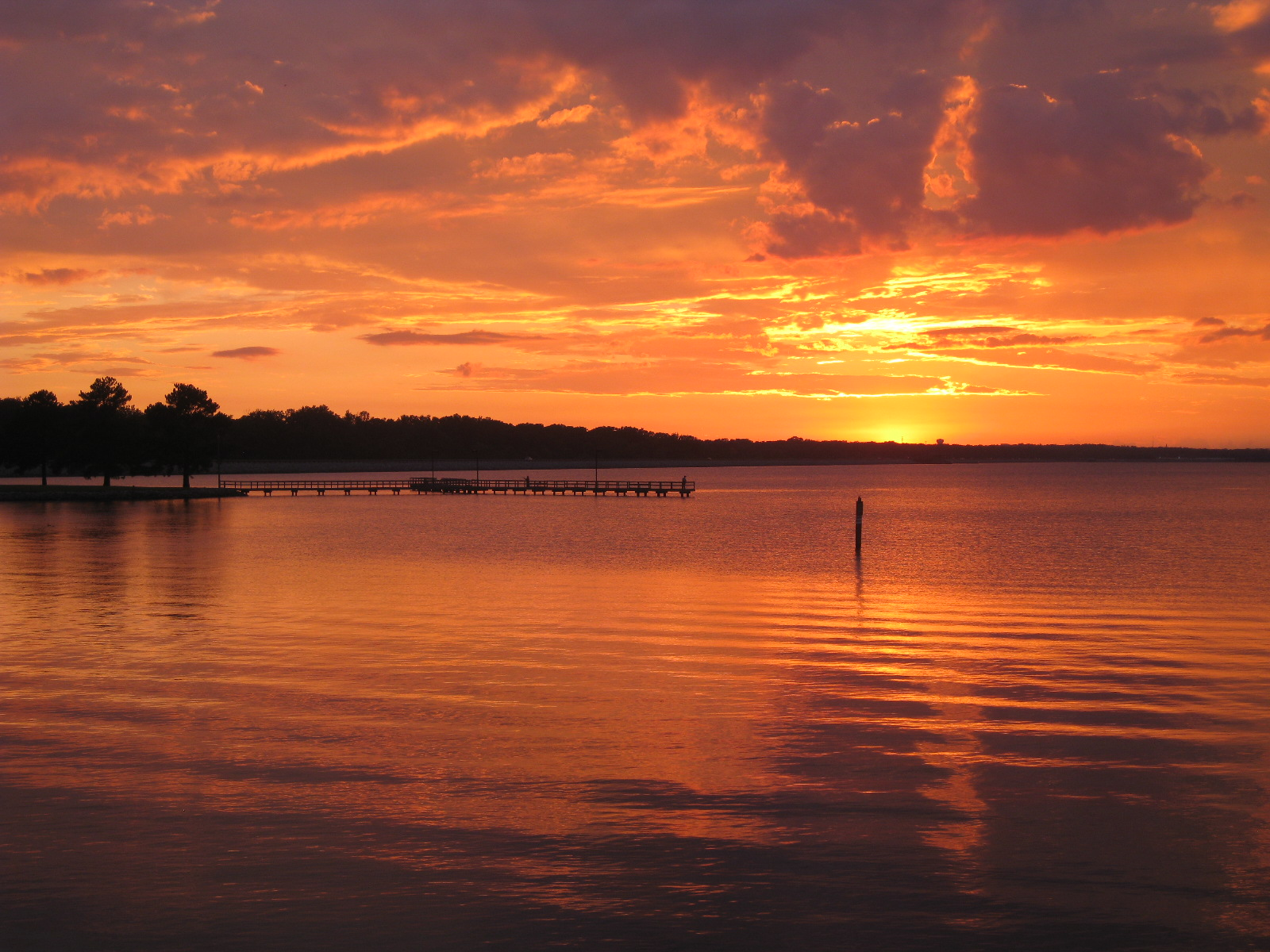
- July sunset at the Ross Barnett Reservoir, showing the public fishing pier on Spillway Road.

- Location within Mississippi Location within the United States
- Location: Madison and Rankin counties, Mississippi, U.S.
- Coordinates: 32°27′26″N 90°01′04″W
- Lake type: Reservoir
- Primary inflows: Pearl River
- Primary outflows: Pearl River
- Basin countries: United States
- Max. length: 16 mi (26 km)
- Max. width: 7 mi (11 km)
- Surface area: 52 sq mi (134.7 km^{2})
- Average depth: 12 ft (3.7 m)
- Max. depth: 60 ft (18.3 m)
- Shore length^{1}: 105 mi (169 km)
- Surface elevation: 300 ft (90 m)
- Settlements: Jackson; Flowood; Brandon; Ridgeland; Madison; Gluckstadt; Canton
- ^{1} Shore length is not a well-defined measure.

The Ross Barnett Reservoir, often called simply the Reservoir, is a reservoir of the Pearl River between Madison and Rankin counties in the U.S. state of Mississippi. The 33,000-acre (130 km^{2}) lake serves as the state's largest drinking water resource, and is managed by the Pearl River Valley Water Supply District. The lake features 105 miles (169 km) of shoreline impounded on the south by a 3.5-mile (5.6 km) man-made dam and spillway. The western shore is bounded by the historic Natchez Trace Parkway.

== History ==
Construction on the Ross Barnett Reservoir began in 1960 by MWH Engineering (now MWH Global) under the direction of the Pearl River Valley Water Supply District. The main purpose of the infrastructure project was to create a permanent water source to supply drinking water for the Mississippi capital city of Jackson. Flooding of the Jackson section of the Pearl River had been studied by the U.S. Army Corps of Engineers since 1930 and city leaders envisioned commercial and industrial benefits from land reclamation associated with flood control. The Jackson Chamber of Commerce prior to the completion of the reservoir promoted riparian land reclamation with industrial development, a new bypass for U.S. Highway 49 constructed upon a levee, straightening the Pearl River channel and potential navigation. Construction on the lake was completed in 1963, and the water level reached average capacity in 1965. The August 17, 1969 passage of Hurricane Camille over the reservoir caused the surface to tilt and created a one-foot level increase at the dam. As part of a national survey the federal government sampled five Mississippi reservoirs in 1973 and determined the Ross Barnett waters to be eutrophic, ranking second among the Mississippi reservoirs in overall trophic quality. In the 1980s two power companies including the local electricity producer, Mississippi Power and Light Company, made applications to the federal government authorities to modify the dam to produce hydropower.

The 1979 Easter flood at Jackson initiated planning to create additional levees below the reservoir and studies of a 68 foot high, dry dam called Shoccoe above the reservoir.

Waterspouts occurred in the reservoir on April 15, 2011, August 19, 2012, and July 23, 2014.

Planning began to provide parks and recreation areas in conjunction with the newly formed lake. Today, the Ross Barnett Reservoir serves as a significant water source, a major recreational area, and a catalyst for residential and economic development. There are 4,600 homes along the reservoir in Madison and Rankin counties.

== Name controversy ==
The reservoir is named for Ross R. Barnett, the 53rd governor of Mississippi, who was known nationwide for his vigorous support for segregation. This has led to multiple petitions and other calls for the name to be changed.

== Management ==
The Ross Barnett Reservoir is managed by the Pearl River Valley Water Supply District (PRVWSD), an agency of the State of Mississippi. In addition to recreation, the reservoir serves as the primary source of drinking water for the City of Jackson's O. B. Curtis Water Treatment Plant. Water released into the Pearl River is monitored and controlled from an electrical/mechanical spillway and gate system that is part of a man-made earthen dam comprising most of the lake's southern shore. The maximum output of the 10-gate spillway is 170,000 cubic feet per second (4,800 m^{3}/s). The guaranteed minimum flow was not included in the statute creating the reservoir, but the 173 cubic feet per second (4.9 m^{3}/s) flow was included in the operational permit. The final design of the reservoir could not be purposed as a flood control project. The target elevation for the lake is 297.5 feet (90.7 m) above sea level in the summer; 297.0 feet (90.5 m) in the winter. The average depth is 11 feet (3.4 m), water clarity is 2 feet (0.61 m) with occasions of 8 feet (2.4 m), and the water color is stained. The lowest pool level in the last eight years was 294 feet (90 m) MLS according to a 1996 boating map, but the lowest pool was 293.68 feet (89.51 m) according to federal data for 2000. Drought conditions occurred in 2007 prompting local concerns. Seismic tests were performed 80 feet (24 m) below the surface of the reservoir in the fall of 2012 by an energy company.

== Recreation ==
Each year over two million people visit the Ross Barnett Reservoir for outdoor recreation: types include boating, fishing, water-skiing, and camping. There are five campgrounds, 16 parks, 22 boat launches, three handicapped-accessible trails, two multi-purpose trails, and a mountain bike trail which meanders near Mule Jail Lake. Two state records come from the reservoir: Smallmouth buffalo (57 lbs 12 oz) and Bowfin (18 lbs 14 oz). In 1974, a state record Paddlefish of 65 lbs was caught at the spillway. In 1978 the Bassmaster Classic World Championship was held at the reservoir. In late March 2019 fishermen reported abundant and large Black crappie when normally White crappie are the main catch.
