= Philadelphia High School (Mississippi) =

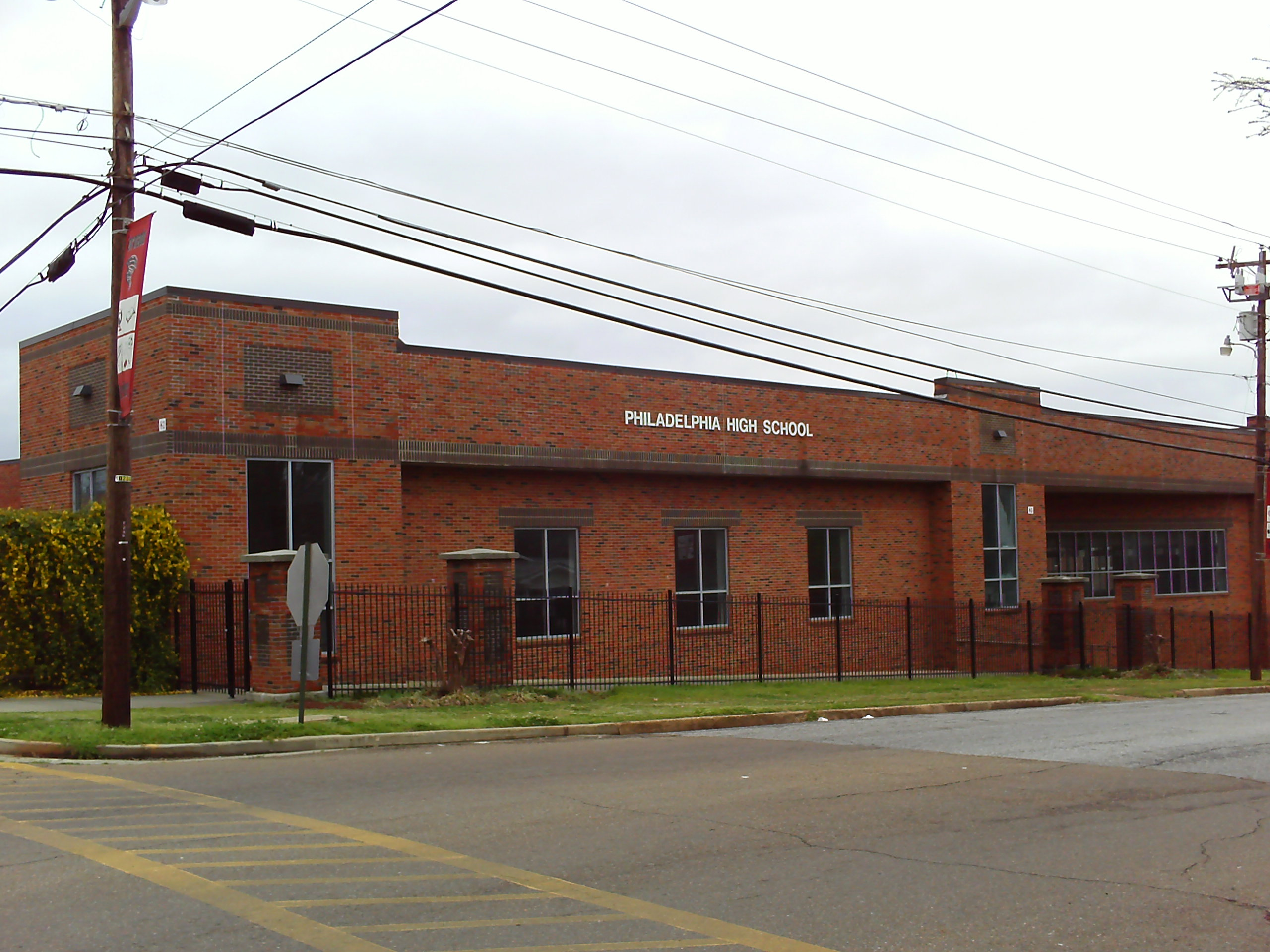

Location
- 248 Byrd Avenue; Philadelphia, Neshoba County, Mississippi 39350
- 32.772479°N 89.111081°W

Information
- School type: Public
- School district: Philadelphia Public School District
- NCES District ID: 2803600
- Superintendent: Shannon Whitehead
- NCES School ID: 280360000692
- Principal: Sherell G. Drake
- Grades: 7-12
- Enrollment: 327
- Student to teacher ratio: 11.0
- Colors: Red, Black, White
- Mascot: Tornado
- Website: Philadelphia High School

Philadelphia High School is in Philadelphia, Mississippi. It is in the Philadelphia Public School District. In 2025, the student body of 238 in grades 9-12 was almost 90 percent African American and 9 percent white. All of the school's students were documented as economically disadvantaged in 2026.

Lindsey O. Todd was superintendent in 1927. In 2006, the school suffered minor fire damage on the second floor.

Tornadoes are the school mascot. In 2024, Georgia Grace, an alumnus, was named head football coach. The class of 1964 held its reunion in 2024.

== History ==
The first school for black children in Philadelphia, the Neshoba County School, met in the Black Masonic Lodge on the east side of the railroad track along Rea Street in the late 1920s. In 1939 the Rosenwald foundation assisted in financing a new school, which was renamed the Neshoba County Training School. In 1948 a new building was built and named Booker T. Washington School after Booker T. Washington. It closed when local schools were integrated in 1970.

Booker T. Washington High School opened in 1948 on Carver Avenue in Philadelphia. It is listed on the National Register of Historic Places listings in Neshoba County, Mississippi. It succeeded a Rosenwald School (Julius Rosenwald) and Neshoba County Training School. The schools were for African American students. Officials closed the high school in 1970 after desegregation. Neshoba Central High School is also in Philadelphia but is in a different school district and has a white majority among its students.

== Alumni ==
- John Thomas Black ("Blondy" Black), football player
- Josh Boyd, football player
- Fred McAfee, football player
- Marcus Dupree, football player
- Bill Stribling, football player
- Lamar Blount, football player

== See also ==
- Neshoba Central High School, also in Philadelphia but part of the Neshoba County School District
