= Lamar Blount =

American football player (1920–2007)

- Blount pursued by Bill Daley, 1947

No. 50, 72, 59
- Positions: End, back

Personal information
- Born: April 11, 1920; Decatur, Mississippi, U.S.
- Died: August 6, 2007 (aged 87); Decatur, Mississippi, U.S.
- Listed height: 6 ft 1 in (1.85 m)
- Listed weight: 190 lb (86 kg)

Career information
- High school: Philadelphia (Philadelphia, Mississippi)
- College: Duke; Mississippi State (1941-1942)
- NFL draft: 1944: 2nd round, 16th overall pick

Career history
- Miami Seahawks (1946); Buffalo Bills (1947); Baltimore Colts (1947)

Career AAFC statistics
- Receptions: 21
- Receiving yards: 366
- Touchdowns: 1
- Stats at Pro Football Reference

Lloyd Lamar Blount (April 11, 1920 – August 6, 2007) was an American professional football end.

Blount was born in Decatur, Mississippi, in 1920 and attended Philadelphia High School. He played college football at Duke and Mississippi State.

He was selected by the New York Giants in the second round (16th overall pick) of the 1944 NFL draft, but by then he was already on active duty with the Marines. In November, 1943, he was sent to Camp Lejeune, NC, for basic training and then to Quantico, VA for Officer Candidate School. He earned his commission as a 2nd Lt., in the US Marine Corp in July, 1944. On April 11, 1945, he was shipped out to Okinawa where he remained in combat until the island was secured. He was prepping to be a part of the ground troop invasion of the mainland of Japan until Japan surrendered. He was then transferred to Beijing, China where he served until March, 1946 as part of the repatriation of China and was honorably discharged in April 1946.

When he returned to the states, he resumed his football career, but not with the Giants or the NFL. He played in the All-America Football Conference (AAFC) for the Miami Seahawks in 1946 and for the Buffalo Bills and Baltimore Colts in 1947. He appeared in a total of 22 professional games, nine of them as a starter, and caught 21 passes for 366 yards.

He died in 2007 in Decatur, Mississippi.
