= Fannegusha Creek (Pearl River tributary) =

Stream in Mississippi, U.S.

Coordinates: 32.5604168°N 89.8709132°W

Fannegusha Creek is a stream in the U.S. state of Mississippi. It is a tributary to the Pearl River.

Fannegusha is a name derived from the Choctaw language purported to mean "tasty squirrel".
