= The Hodges Brothers =

American musical group

The Hodges Brothers were an American bluegrass quartet from Bogue Chitto, Mississippi, United States. The group consisted of Ralph Hodges (guitar, vocals), Felix Hodges (violin), James Hodges (rhythm guitar), and John White (bass, vocals). They released singles on Trumpet and Whispering Pines. In 1956, they ventured into rockabilly for a session at Mississippi Records, releasing their most well-known track "I'm Gonna Rock Some Too." They released their only album, Watermelon Hangin' On The Vine, on Arhoolie in 1962.

== Discography ==
=== Albums ===
- 1962: Watermelon Hangin' On The Vine (Arhoolie Records)

=== EPs ===
- 1960: Country And Western Express - Vol. 2 (Top Rank International )

=== Singles ===
- 1952: "My Heart Fell At Her Feet" / "It Won't Be Long" (Trumpet 160)
- 1956: "I'm Gonna Rock Some Too" / "Because I Loved You So" (Mississippi 574)
- 1958: "Searching My Dreams For You" / "I Dream Of Loving You" (Whispering Pines 200)
- 1958: "Honey Talk" / "I'll Always Love You" (Whispering Pines 201)
