= Josh Boyd =

American football player (born 1989)

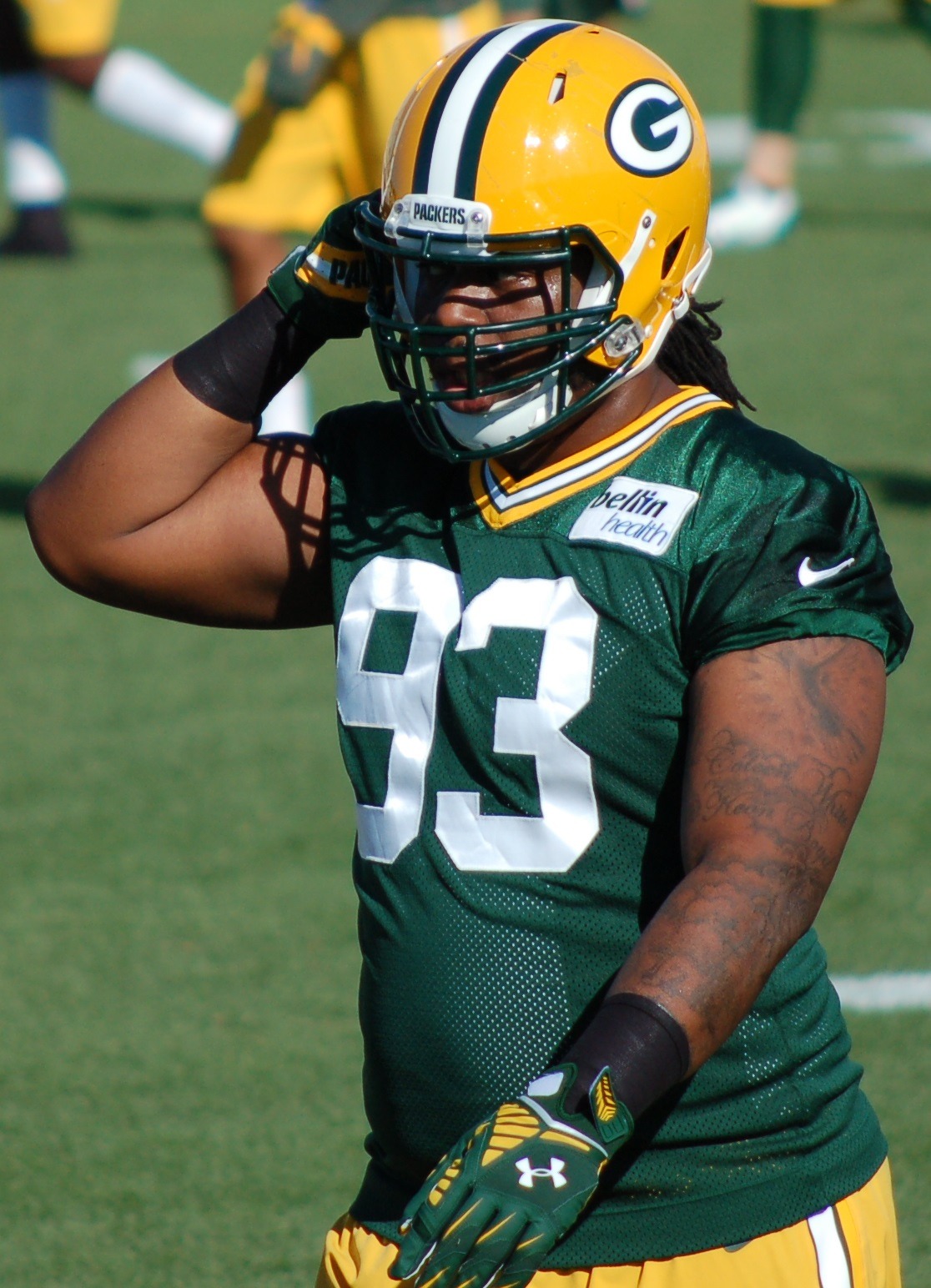
- Boyd with the Green Bay Packers in 2015

No. 93
- Position: Defensive tackle

Personal information
- Born: August 3, 1989 (age 37); Jackson, Mississippi, U.S.
- Listed height: 6 ft 3 in (1.91 m)
- Listed weight: 310 lb (141 kg)

Career information
- High school: Philadelphia (Philadelphia, Mississippi)
- College: Mississippi State
- NFL draft: 2013: 5th round, 167th overall pick

Career history
- Green Bay Packers (2013–2015); Indianapolis Colts (2017)*; Birmingham Iron (2019)*
- * Offseason or practice squad member only

Career NFL statistics
- Total tackles: 28
- Stats at Pro Football Reference

Josh Boyd (born August 3, 1989) is an American former professional football player who was a defensive tackle in the National Football League (NFL). He was selected by the Green Bay Packers in the fifth round of the 2013 NFL draft after playing college football for the Mississippi State Bulldogs.

== Early life ==
Boyd was born in Jackson, Mississippi, and attended Philadelphia High School in Philadelphia, Mississippi. He lettered in both basketball, and football. During his junior year, he registered 154 tackles (27 for loss), and eight sacks. He also blocked two field goals and extra points. His performance earned him first-team all-state honors by the Jackson Clarion-Ledger and second-team all-state in all other classifications. His success continued into his senior year, as he had 112 tackles, seven sacks, three fumble recoveries, and a blocked kick. His performance led to more honors including being selected to play in the Mississippi-Alabama High School All-Star game and the U.S. Army All-American Bowl.

== College career ==
Boyd was ranked as the fifteenth best defensive tackle in the country, and the sixth best player in the state by Rivals.com. He received scholarships from a number of schools including Auburn, Miami, Florida State, Mississippi, Southern Mississippi, and Tennessee. He ran the 40 yard dash in 4.85 seconds, benched 365 pounds, squatted 500 pounds, and had a 2.5 GPA.

Boyd ultimately signed his letter of intent to become a Mississippi State Bulldog. He played in all 12 games during his first year on the team and started three of them. During his first game, against Jackson State, he had two tackles. He had his season high in tackles against Georgia Tech.

During his sophomore year, Boyd started every game at defensive tackle. During a Southeastern Conference battle against the Kentucky Wildcats, he had five tackles (2.5 for loss) and one and a half sacks. He finished the season with 24 tackles and 2.5 sacks on the year.

The next year Boyd played in all 13 games with the Bulldogs and started every game but one of them. During the season opener against Memphis he had his first sack of the season. He continued on against LSU where he had seven tackles, two of which were solo. He finished the season with a career-high 51 tackles (14 solo), eight tackles for a loss, and 4.5 sacks.

Going into his final year with the team, Boyd was named a second-team preseason All-American by Athlon Sports. He was also on the watchlist for the Outland Trophy, given to the best interior lineman each year. In another SEC conference clash, Boyd registered his first fumble recovery in his career. Later that year, during a game against Texas A&M, he blocked a 33-yard field goal on the final play in the first half. He finished the final year of his college career with 33 tackles and 1.5 sacks.

== Professional career ==
=== Pre-draft ===
Boyd was projected to be fifth to sixth round pick in the 2012 NFL draft. He was said to have good body fluidity to redirect his momentum and quick feet capable of making plays at the line of scrimmage. However, he was also said to be underdeveloped in the pass rush and quickly neutralized if his first move did not succeed.

Pre-draft measurables
| Height | Weight | 40-yard dash | 10-yard split | 20-yard split | 20-yard shuttle | Three-cone drill | Vertical jump | Broad jump | Bench press | Wonderlic |
|---|---|---|---|---|---|---|---|---|---|---|
| 6 ft 3 in (1.91 m) | 310 lb (141 kg) | 5.14 s | 1.71 s | 2.89 s | 4.64 s | 7.16 s | 26.50 in (0.67 m) | 8 ft 8 in (2.64 m) | 32 reps | 14 |
All results from NFL Combine

=== Green Bay Packers ===
Boyd was selected by the Green Bay Packers with a compensatory fifth round pick (167th overall). In 2014, Boyd received playing time after BJ Raji had a torn biceps injury. In 2015, Boyd exited Week 2 against the Seattle Seahawks after suffering an ankle injury. He was placed on injured reserve and missed most of the season. On May 9, 2016, Boyd was released by the Packers.

=== Indianapolis Colts ===
On May 12, 2017, Boyd signed with the Indianapolis Colts. On September 2, 2017, Boyd was released by the Colts.

=== Birmingham Iron ===
Boyd signed with the Birmingham Iron of the Alliance of American Football for the 2019 season.

=== Statistics ===
Regular season

| Season | Team | Games | | Tackles | | | | |
| Season | Team | GP | GS | Total | Solo | Ast | Sck | Int |
|---|---|---|---|---|---|---|---|---|
| 2013 | Green Bay Packers | 9 | 0 | 6 | 5 | 1 | 0 | 0 |
| 2014 | Green Bay Packers | 15 | 4 | 22 | 10 | 12 | 0 | 0 |
| 2015 | Green Bay Packers | 2 | 0 | 1 | 1 | 0 | 0 | 0 |
| | Total | 26 | 4 | 29 | 16 | 13 | 0 | 0 |

Postseason

| Season | Team | Games | | Tackles | | | | |
| Season | Team | GP | GS | Total | Solo | Ast | Sck | Int |
|---|---|---|---|---|---|---|---|---|
| 2013 | Green Bay Packers | 1 | 0 | 0 | 0 | 0 | 0 | 0 |
| 2014 | Green Bay Packers | 2 | 1 | 3 | 1 | 2 | 0 | 0 |
| | Total | 3 | 1 | 3 | 1 | 2 | 0 | 0 |
