= Tucker, Mississippi =

- CDP
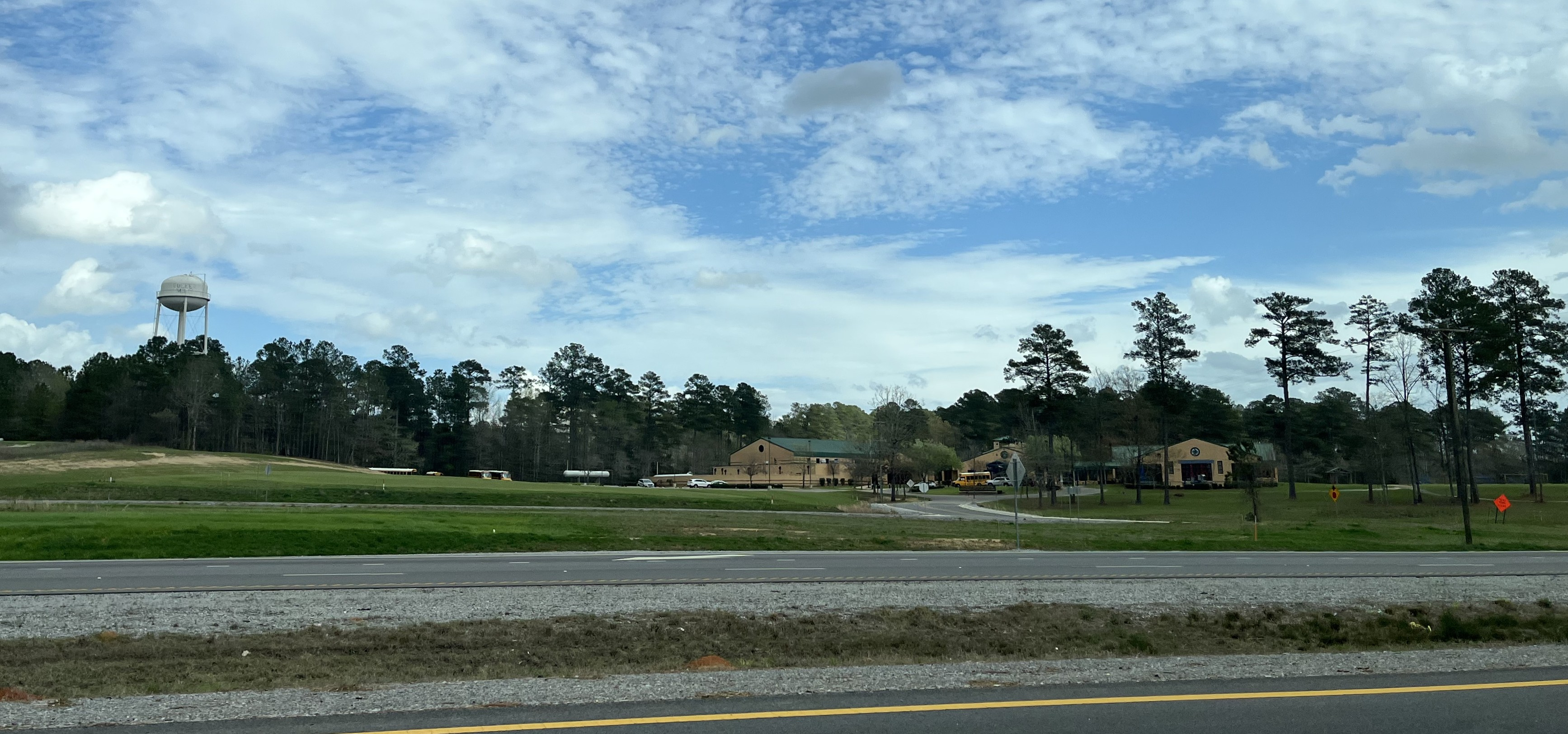
- Tucker Elementary School and water tower from Mississippi Highway 19

- Location of Tucker, Mississippi

- Location in the United States
- Coordinates: 32°42′24″N 89°3′22″W
- Country: United States
- State: Mississippi
- County: Neshoba

Area
  - Total: 3.89 sq mi (10.07 km^{2})
  - Land: 3.88 sq mi (10.04 km^{2})
  - Water: 0.012 sq mi (0.03 km^{2})
- Elevation: 490 ft (150 m)

Population (2020)
  - Total: 642
  - Density: 165.6/sq mi (63.93/km^{2})
- Time zone: UTC-6 (Central (CST))
  - Summer (DST): UTC-5 (CDT)
- FIPS code: 28-74675
- GNIS feature ID: 0678912

Tucker is a census-designated place (CDP) in Neshoba County, Mississippi. It is one of the eight communities of the Mississippi Band of Choctaw Indians Reservation and the population is 93% Choctaw. The population was 642 at the 2020 census.

== Geography ==
Tucker is located at 32°42′24″N 89°3′22″W (32.706559, -89.055984).

According to the United States Census Bureau, the CDP has a total area of 3.7 square miles (9.6 km^{2}), of which 3.7 square miles (9.6 km^{2}) is land and 0.04 square miles (0.10 km^{2}) (0.55%) is water.

== Demographics ==
Historical population
Census	Pop.	Note	%±
2020	642		—
U.S. Decennial Census

Tucker racial composition as of 2020 (NH = Non-Hispanic) (Note: Note: the US Census treats Hispanic/Latino as an ethnic category. This table excludes Latinos from the racial categories and assigns them to a separate category. Hispanics/Latinos can be of any race.)
Race	Number	Percentage
White (NH)	46	7.17%
Black or African American (NH)	1	0.16%
Native American or Alaska Native (NH)	560	87.23%
Asian (NH)	2	0.31%
Mixed/Multi-Racial (NH)	26	4.05%
Hispanic or Latino	7	1.09%
Total	642	

As of the 2020 United States census, there were 642 people, 146 households, and 120 families residing in the CDP.

As of the census of 2000, there were 534 people, 154 households, and 125 families residing in the CDP. The population density was 146.4 inhabitants per square mile (56.5/km^{2}). There were 159 housing units at an average density of 43.6 per square mile (16.8/km^{2}). The racial makeup of the CDP was 5.99% White, 0.19% African American, 92.88% Native American, 0.56% from other races, and 0.37% from two or more races. Hispanic or Latino of any race were 0.56% of the population.

There were 154 households, out of which 53.2% had children under the age of 18 living with them, 33.8% were married couples living together, 34.4% had a female householder with no husband present, and 18.2% were non-families. 14.9% of all households were made up of individuals, and 5.8% had someone living alone who was 65 years of age or older. The average household size was 3.47 and the average family size was 3.76.

In the CDP, the population was spread out, with 42.5% under the age of 18, 11.6% from 18 to 24, 30.1% from 25 to 44, 11.2% from 45 to 64, and 4.5% who were 65 years of age or older. The median age was 22 years. For every 100 females, there were 87.4 males. For every 100 females age 18 and over, there were 79.5 males.

The median income for a household in the CDP was $21,607, and the median income for a family was $19,943. Males had a median income of $16,458 versus $16,750 for females. The per capita income for the CDP was $5,939. About 33.0% of families and 31.0% of the population were below the poverty line, including 27.5% of those under age 18 and 59.3% of those age 65 or over.

== Education ==
Tucker is served by the Neshoba County School District.

Native American students are eligible to attend schools in the Choctaw Tribal School System, a tribal school system operated by the Mississippi Band of Choctaw Indians. Tucker Elementary School is in the community.

East Central Community College is the community college of Neshoba County.
