= Bill Stribling =

American football player (1927–2006)

No. 81, 80, 79
- Position: End

Personal information
- Born: November 5, 1927; Edinburg, Mississippi, U.S.
- Died: August 22, 2006 (aged 78); Rogers, Arkansas, U.S.
- Listed height: 6 ft 1 in (1.85 m)
- Listed weight: 206 lb (93 kg)

Career information
- High school: Philadelphia (Philadelphia, Mississippi)
- College: Ole Miss (1945, 1948–1950)
- NFL draft: 1950: 21st round, 267th overall pick

Career history
- New York Giants (1951–1953); Philadelphia Eagles (1955–1957); Toronto Argonauts (1960)

Career NFL statistics
- Receptions: 114
- Receiving yards: 1,573
- Touchdowns: 14
- Stats at Pro Football Reference

Majure Blanks "Bill" Stribling Sr. (November 5, 1927 – August 22, 2006) was an American professional football end in the National Football League for the New York Giants and the Philadelphia Eagles. He also played one season in Canada with the Toronto Argonauts. He played college football at the University of Mississippi and was drafted in the 21st round of the 1950 NFL draft. Stribling is known as being the player who caught future Dallas Cowboys head coach Tom Landry's sole NFL touchdown pass.

== NFL career statistics ==
Legend
**Bold**	Career high

Year	Team	Games		Receiving				
Year	Team	GP	GS	Rec	Yds	Avg	Lng	TD
1951	NYG	6	1	18	226	12.6	42	2
1952	NYG	12	12	26	399	**15.3**	55	5
1953	NYG	12	12	16	175	10.9	19	0
1955	PHI	12	8	**38**	**568**	14.9	56	**6**
1956	PHI	2	0	2	11	5.5	7	0
1957	PHI	12	5	14	194	13.9	**58**	1
		56	38	114	1,573	13.8	58	14
