= Tim Edwards (gridiron football) =

American football player (born 1968)

No. 98, 93
- Position: Defensive tackle

Personal information
- Born: August 29, 1968 (age 58); Philadelphia, Mississippi, U.S
- Listed height: 6 ft 1 in (1.85 m)
- Listed weight: 270 lb (122 kg)

Career information
- High school: Neshoba Central (Philadelphia)
- College: Delta State (1987–1990)
- NFL draft: 1991: 12th round, 307th overall pick

Career history

Playing
- New England Patriots (1991–1992); Saskatchewan Roughriders (1995–1996)

Coaching
- Delta State (1996) Graduate assistant; Kentucky State (1998–2000) Defensive line coach; Kentucky State (2001) Linebackers coach; Carolina Rhinos (2002) Defensive coordinator; Pearl River CC (2002) Defensive line coach; Hampton (2003) Linebackers coach; Hampton (2004–2007) Recruiting coordinator and defensive line coach; Florida A&M (2008–2010) Defensive coordinator; Louisiana Lafayette (2011–2014) Defensive line coach; Buffalo (2015–2018) Defensive line coach; Memphis (2019) Defensive line coach

Awards and highlights
- 2× First-team All-GSC (1989, 1990)

Career NFL statistics
- Sacks: 1
- Stats at Pro Football Reference

Timothy Edwards (born August 29, 1968) is an American former professional football defensive tackle who played one season with the New England Patriots of the National Football League (NFL). He played college football at Delta State and was selected by the Patriots in the 12th round of the 1991 NFL draft. He also played for the Saskatchewan Roughriders of the Canadian Football League (CFL). Edwards became a coach after his playing career.

== Early life ==
Timothy Edwards was born on August 29, 1968, in Philadelphia, Mississippi, where he attended Neshoba Central High School. He was a four-year letterman for the Delta State Statesmen of Delta State University from 1987 to 1990. He earned first-team All-Gulf South Conference honors in both 1989 and 1990. Edwards played in the Senior Bowl after his senior year. He graduated from Delta State in 1991 with a degree in aviation management. He was inducted into the school's athletics hall of fame in 2008.

== Professional career ==
Edwards was selected by the New England Patriots in the 12th round, with the 307th overall pick, of the 1991 NFL draft. He officially signed with the team on July 12. He was released on August 26, and signed to the team's practice squad on August 28, where he spent the entire 1991 season. Edwards became a free agent after the 1991 season and re-signed with the Patriots on May 20, 1992. He was released on August 31, signed to the practice squad on September 2, promoted to the active roster on September 18, released again on September 22, signed to the practice squad again on September 24, and promoted to the active roster again on October 2, 1992. Overall, he played in 14 games, starting one, for the Patriots during the 1992 season and posted one sack. Edwards was released by the Patriots on August 26, 1993.

Edwards dressed in 11 games for the Saskatchewan Roughriders of the Canadian Football League in 1995, recording 22 defensive tackles, one special teams tackle, and one fumble recovery. He dressed in 15 games during the 1996 season, totaling 39 defensive tackles, one special teams tackle, four sacks, one fumble recovery, and one pass breakup. In May 1997, it was reported that he would be out for two months due to torn muscles. He was later given medical clearance to play, but instead decided to retire.

== Coaching career ==
Edwards began his coaching career in 1996 as a graduate assistant at Delta State. He joined Kentucky State in 1998, serving as defensive line coach from 1998 to 2000 and linebackers coach in 2001. He was the defensive coordinator of the Carolina Rhinos of the af2 in the spring of 2002. Edwards then served as the defensive line coach at Pearl River Community College during fall 2002. He joined the Hampton Pirates in 2003 as linebackers coach. He was then Hampton's recruiting coordinator and defensive line coach from 2004 to 2007.

Edwards was the defensive coordinator at Florida A&M from 2008 to 2010. He then served as the defensive line coach at Louisiana Lafayette from 2011 to 2014, at Buffalo from 2015 to 2018, and at Memphis in 2019.
