= Derrick Hoskins =

American football player (born 1970)

No. 20, 28
- Position: Safety

Personal information
- Born: November 14, 1970 (age 55); Philadelphia, Mississippi, U.S.
- Listed height: 6 ft 2 in (1.88 m)
- Listed weight: 210 lb (95 kg)

Career information
- High school: Neshoba Central
- College: Southern Mississippi
- NFL draft: 1992: 5th round, 128th overall pick

Career history
- Los Angeles/Oakland Raiders (1992–1995); New Orleans Saints (1996); Green Bay Packers (1997)*
- * Offseason or practice squad member only

Career NFL statistics
- Tackles: 229
- Interceptions: 3
- Fumble recoveries: 2
- Stats at Pro Football Reference

Derrick Tremayne Hoskins (born November 14, 1970) is an American former professional football player who was a safety in the National Football League. He played five seasons for the Los Angeles/Oakland Raiders (1992–1995) and the New Orleans Saints (1996). He played college football for the Southern Miss Golden Eagles before being selected 128th overall by the Raiders in the fifth round of the 1992 NFL Draft. 1991 Second-Team All-South Independent Football
