= Philadelphia Public School District =

School district in Mississippi

Philadelphia High School
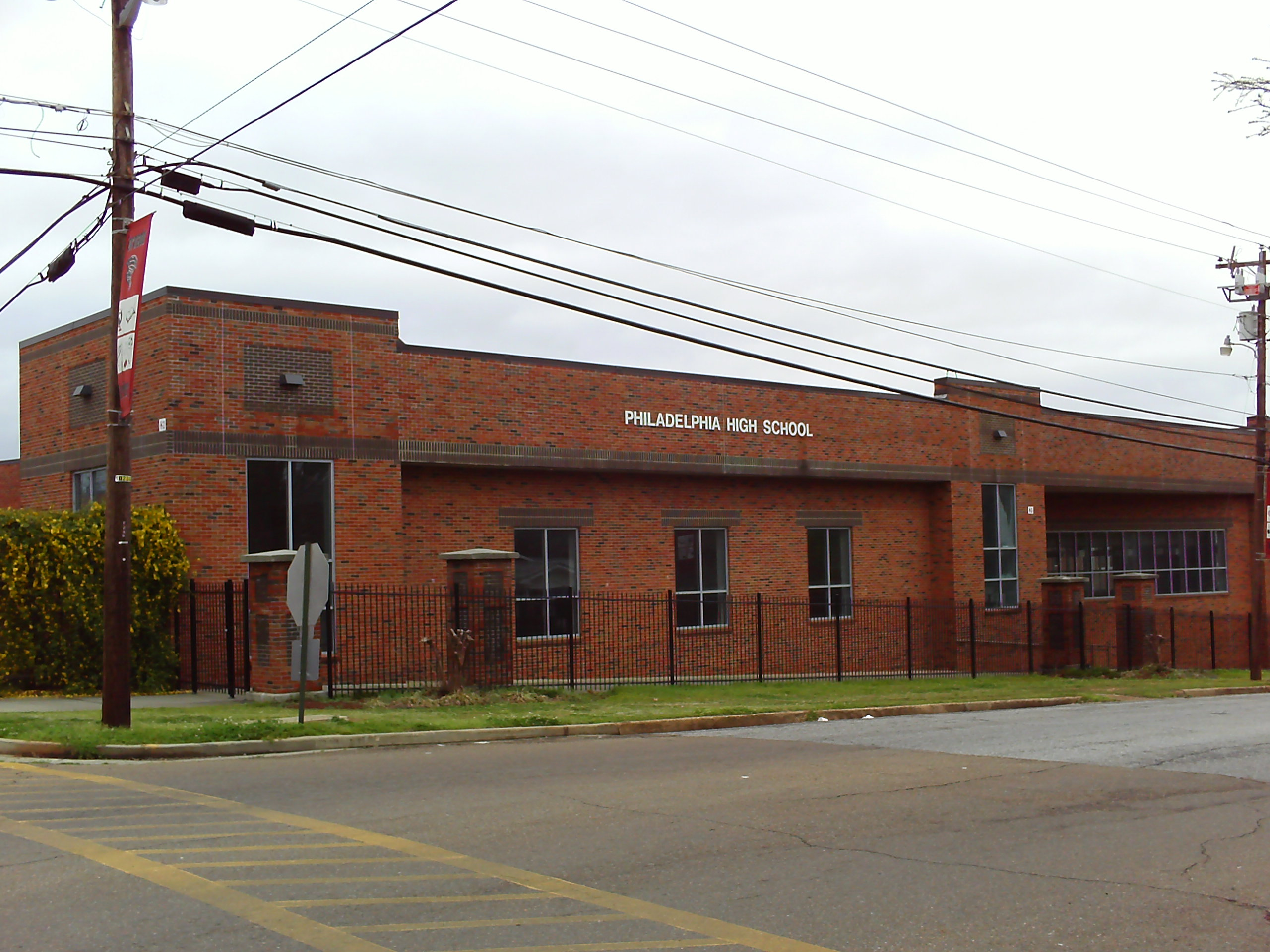

Location
- 248 Byrd Avenue; Philadelphia, (Neshoba County), Mississippi 39350; United States; 32.772479°N 89.111081°W

Information
- Type: Public high school
- Principal: Sherell Griffin-Drake
- Staff: 35.54 (FTE)
- Enrollment: 338 (2023-24)
- Student to teacher ratio: 9.51
- Colors: Red, black and white
- Nickname: Tornadoes
- Website: Philadelphia High School

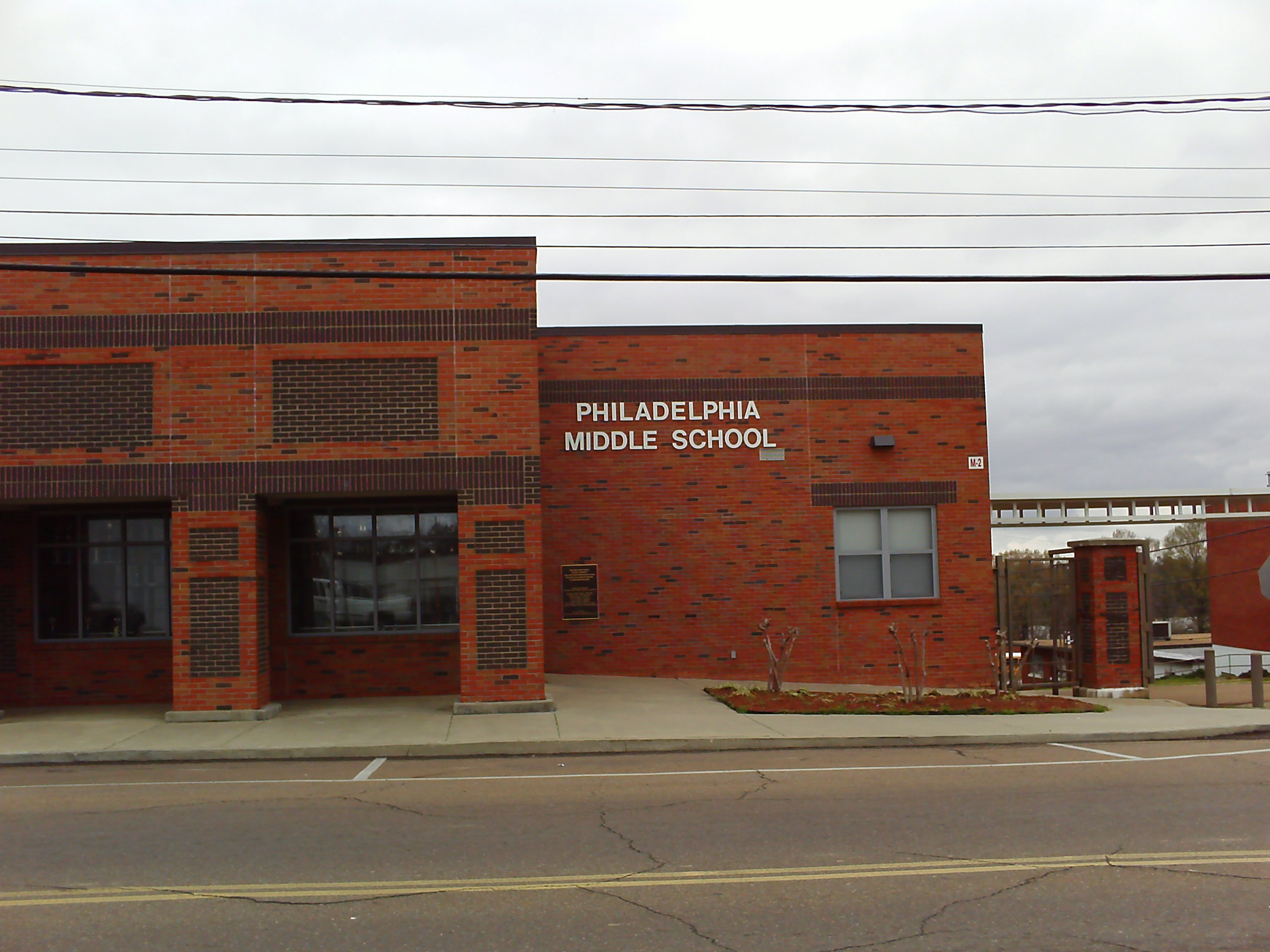
Philadelphia Middle School

The Philadelphia Public School District is a public school district based in Philadelphia, Mississippi, United States.

It includes most of the Philadelphia city limits.

== Schools ==
The schools include Philadelphia High School (Mississippi), Philadelphia Middle School, Philadelphia Elementary School, and Vo-Tech.

== Demographics ==
=== 2006-07 school year ===
There were a total of 1,191 students enrolled in the Philadelphia Public School District during the 2006–2007 school year. The district's student population was 50% female and 50% male. The racial makeup of the district was 68.09% African American, 28.80% White, 1.09% Hispanic, 0.42% Asian, and 1.60% Native American. 65.2% of the district's students were eligible for free lunch.

=== Previous school years ===
School Year	Enrollment	Gender Makeup		Racial Makeup				
School Year	Enrollment	Female	Male	Asian	African American	Hispanic	Native American	White
2005-06	1,103	50%	50%	0.45%	66.27%	1.00%	1.54%	30.73%
2004-05	1,147	50%	50%	0.70%	65.13%	0.70%	1.48%	32.00%
2003-04	1,166	49%	51%	1.11%	64.07%	0.69%	1.29%	32.85%
2002-03	1,219	48%	52%	0.98%	62.59%	1.07%	1.31%	34.04%

== Accountability statistics ==
	2006-07	2005-06	2004-05	2003-04	2002-03
District Accreditation Status	Accredited	Accredited	Accredited	Accredited	Accredited
School Performance Classifications
Level 5 (Superior Performing) Schools	0	0	0	1	0
Level 4 (Exemplary) Schools	1	0	1	0	1
Level 3 (Successful) Schools	2	3	2	2	1
Level 2 (Under Performing) Schools	0	0	0	0	0
Level 1 (Low Performing) Schools	0	0	0	0	0
Not Assigned	0	0	0	0	0

== Notable alumni ==
- Iris Kelso (Class of 1944), Louisiana journalist
- Marcus Dupree (Class of 1982), American football player
- Adam M. Byrd (Class of 1877), U.S. Representative
- Marty Stuart, American country music singer and songwriter
- C.J. Johnson (Class of 2011), American football player

== See also ==
- List of school districts in Mississippi
