= Choctaw Tribal School System =

School system in Mississippi, United States

Coordinates: 32.784191°N 89.233608°W

The Choctaw Tribal School System is a school system based in the community of Choctaw, Mississippi (US). An entity operated by the federally recognized Mississippi Band of Choctaw Indians, the system consists of eight schools in three counties: Neshoba, Leake, and Newton. It has a total enrollment of 1,700 to 1,800 students. It is the largest unified and locally controlled Indian school system in the United States. It is affiliated with the Bureau of Indian Education (BIE). The current director of schools is Delnita Jones.

All eight schools are Title I schools with a majority of students being bilingual, speaking both Choctaw and English.

The National Center for Education Statistics classifies the school system and its schools as public.

== Accreditation ==
The Choctaw Tribal School System and its schools are accredited by the Mississippi Department of Education, as well as by the Southern Association of Colleges and Schools.

== Eligibility ==
Students must belong to a recognized Native American tribe and be, at minimum, one-fourth Native American to attend the schools.

== Dormitory ==
The system operates a dormitory for its secondary students who do not live in the Pearl River area. It is called the Choctaw Central Dormitory, and takes students in grades 7-12.

== Schools ==
- Bogue Chitto Elementary School (Grades PK-8)
- Choctaw Central High School (Grades 9-12)
- Choctaw Central Middle School (Grades 7-8)
- Conehatta Elementary School (Grades PK-8)
- Pearl River Elementary School (Grades PK-6)
- Red Water Elementary School (Grades PK-8)
- Standing Pine Elementary School (Grades PK-6)
- Tucker Elementary School (Grades PK-8)

== Notable visitors ==
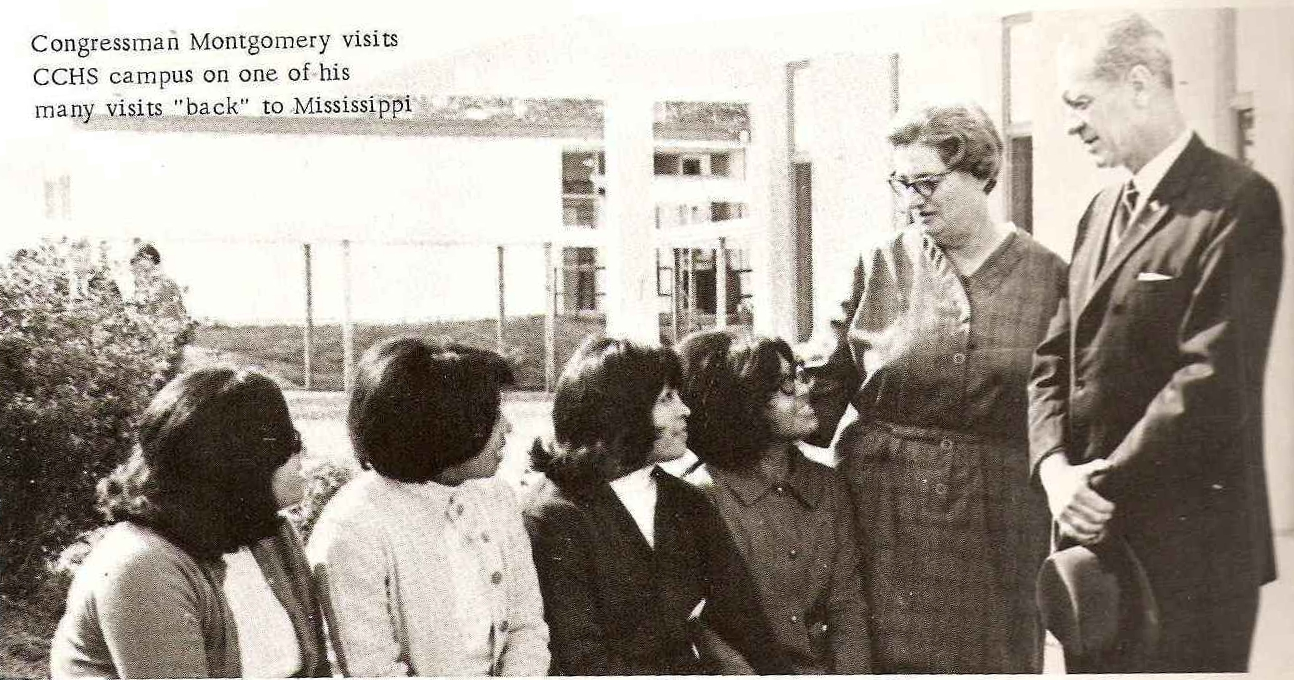
U.S. Representative Montgomery's 1969 visit to Choctaw Central High.

- In 1969 and later in 1971, Congressman G.V. "Sonny" Montgomery, who served in the U.S. House of Representatives 1967–1997, visited Choctaw Central High School.

During his senior year in high school, Marcus Dupree rushed for 1,955 yards with 26 touchdowns. On November 13, 1981, Dupree's final high school game was at Choctaw Bowl at Choctaw Central High School's Warriors Stadium. He broke a record on yards rushed. Willie Morris, author, described the audience as "the most distinctive crowds I had ever seen ... four thousand or so people seemed almost an equal of a mix of whites, blacks, and Indians ... After Marcus scored his touchdown, [Sid Salter] saw Cecil Price Sr. who was ... 'jumping up and down and cheering as hard as anyone ... ain't that a kick in the pants?'" In a separate visit in 1983, Dupree came to the school for one-on-one sessions with students.

The stadium on the reservation was the finest I had seen all year, with excellent lights, and a large concrete grandstand on one side, and bleachers on the other. A gymnasium-field house was adjacent to the grandstand with-what else?- WARRIORS in sizable letters on the facade. Although the game was more than an hour away, it was obvious there would be a big crowd.

— Willie Morris

In 1985, Eunice Kennedy Shriver, a member of the Kennedy family and founder of the Special Olympics, spoke and praised the school's involvement with the "Let's Play to Grow" program.

In the mid-1990s, Billy Mills, the second Native American to win an Olympic gold medal, spoke to the school body.

In 2000, John Herrington, the first Native American NASA astronaut, visited the campus. He flew his first space mission two years later as a mission specialist aboard STS-113.

In 2008, Rodney A. Grant, a Native American actor famous for his role in the movie Dances with Wolves, visited the campus.
