= Pinishook Creek =

Stream in Neshoba and Winston County, Mississippi, U.S.

Coordinates: 32°49′51″N 89°07′21″W

Pinishook Creek is a stream in Neshoba and Winston counties in the U.S. state of Mississippi. It is a tributary to the Pearl River.

Pinishook is a name derived from the Choctaw language meaning "linden or basswood tree".
