= Old Fannegusha Creek =

Stream in Holmes County, Mississippi, U.S.

Old Fannegusha Creek is a stream in Holmes County the U.S. state of Mississippi. It is a tributary to Tchula Lake.

The stream begins at 33°09′05″N 90°15′21″W just west of Shackleford and the confluence with Tchula Lake is at 33°08′56″N 90°17′50″W.

Fannegusha is a name derived from the Choctaw language purported to mean "tasty squirrel". Variant names for Fannegusha Creek are "Foney Bush Creek", "Funnegusha Creek", and "Funnigusha Creek".
