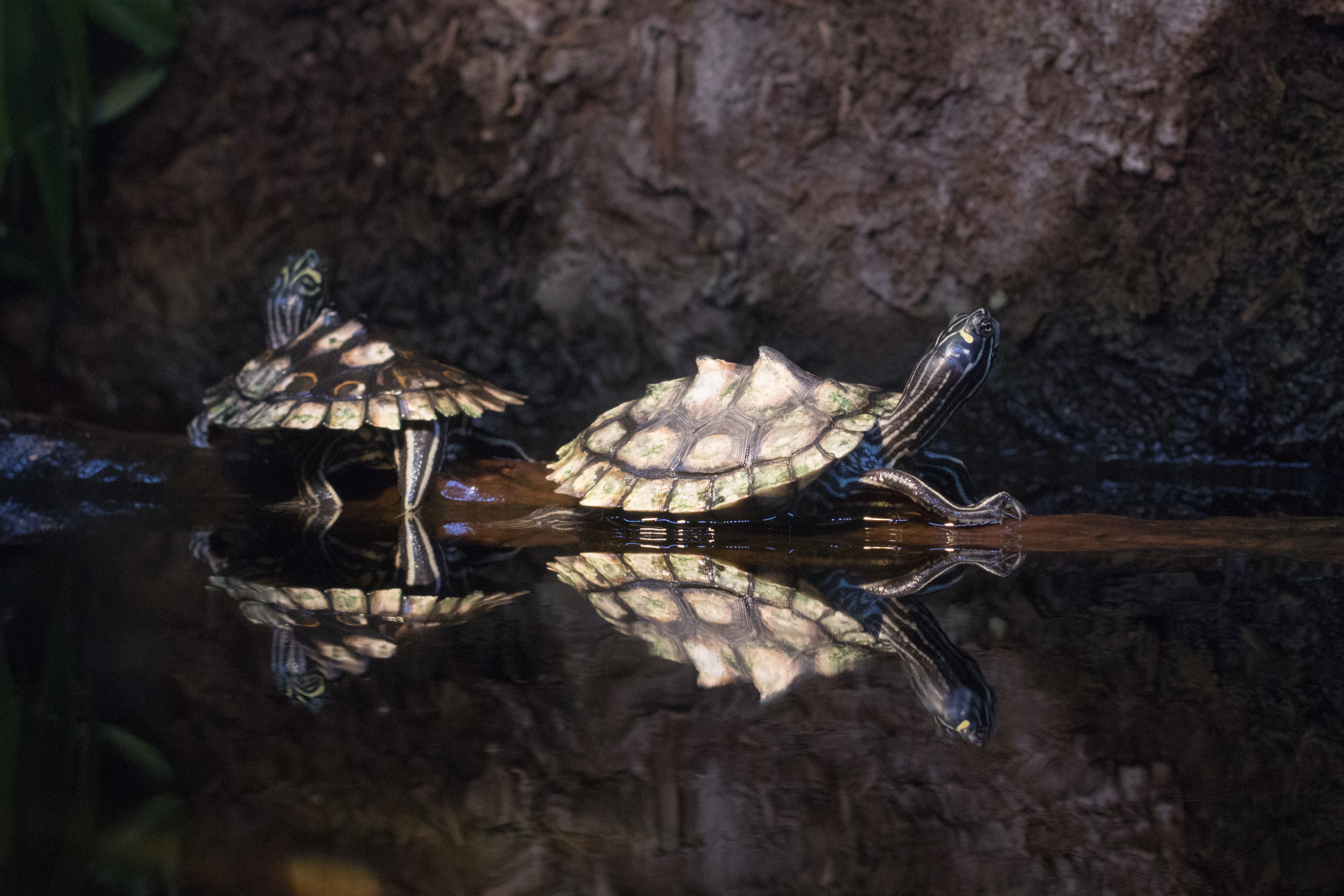

Conservation status
- Vulnerable (IUCN 3.1)

Scientific classification
- Kingdom: Animalia
- Phylum: Chordata
- Class: Reptilia
- Order: Testudines
- Suborder: Cryptodira
- Family: Emydidae
- Genus: Graptemys
- Species: G. oculifera

Binomial name
- Graptemys oculifera (Baur, 1890)
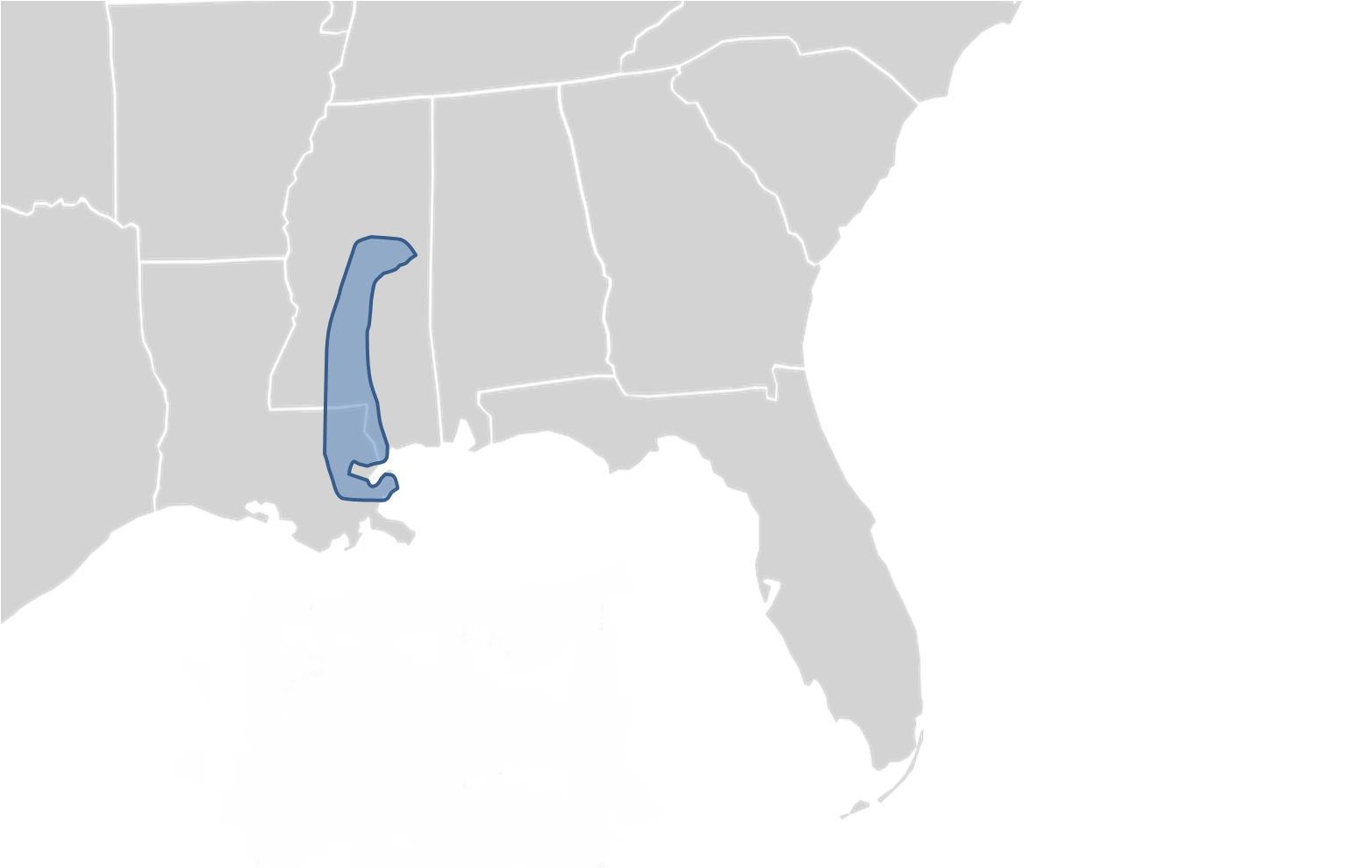
- Range map

Synonyms
- Malacoclemmys oculifera Baur, 1890; Graptemys oculifera — Baur, 1893; Malaclemys lesueurii oculifera — Siebenrock, 1909; Graptemys pseudogeographica oculifera — Stejneger & Barbour, 1917; Graptemys oculifera oculifera — Mertens & Wermuth, 1955; Malaclemys oculifera — McDowell, 1964; Malaclemys oculifer — Cochran & Goin, 1970; Graptemys ocalifera Nutaphand, 1979 (ex errore); Graptemys oculifera — H.M. Smith & Brodie, 1982

= Ringed map turtle =

Species of turtle

The ringed map turtle or ringed sawback (Graptemys oculifera) is a species of turtle in the family Emydidae endemic to the southern United States.

== Geographic range ==
It is frequently found in the Pearl River system in Louisiana and Mississippi. It shares this range with the Pearl River map turtle (G. pearlensis).

== Description ==
Male turtles may attain a carapace length of 10 cm (4 in). Females are larger, and may attain a carapace length of 22 cm (8.5 in). On the carapace are light-colored rings, which are thicker than the rings on Graptemys nigrinoda.
