= Pearl River, Mississippi =

- CDP
- Location of Pearl River, Mississippi

- Location in the United States
- Coordinates: 32°47′7″N 89°14′9″W
- Country: United States
- State: Mississippi
- County: Neshoba

Area
  - Total: 31.03 sq mi (80.37 km^{2})
  - Land: 31.00 sq mi (80.28 km^{2})
  - Water: 0.035 sq mi (0.09 km^{2})
- Elevation: 520 ft (160 m)

Population (2020)
  - Total: 3,822
  - Density: 123.3/sq mi (47.61/km^{2})
- Time zone: UTC-6 (Central (CST))
  - Summer (DST): UTC-5 (CDT)
- FIPS code: 28-55930
- GNIS feature ID: 0675540

Pearl River is a census-designated place (CDP) in Neshoba County, Mississippi. It is one of the eight communities of the Mississippi Band of Choctaw Indians Reservation and the population is 80% Choctaw. As of the 2020 census, Pearl River had a population of 3,822.

== Geography ==
According to the United States Census Bureau, the CDP has a total area of 30.8 square miles (80 km^{2}), of which 30.7 square miles (80 km^{2}) is land and 0.04 square miles (0.10 km^{2}) (0.13%) is water.

== Demographics ==
Historical population
Census	Pop.	Note	%±
1990	2,136		—
2000	3,156		47.8%
2010	3,601		14.1%
2020	3,822		6.1%
U.S. Decennial Census

=== Racial and ethnic composition ===
Pearl River CDP, Mississippi – Racial composition Note: the US Census treats Hispanic/Latino as an ethnic category. This table excludes Latinos from the racial categories and assigns them to a separate category. Hispanics/Latinos may be of any race.
Race (NH = Non-Hispanic)	% 2020	% 2010	% 2000	Pop 2020	Pop 2010	Pop 2000
White alone (NH)	11.3%	12.5%	16.2%	432	450	511
Black alone (NH)	2%	1.8%	1.3%	75	65	41
American Indian alone (NH)	81.7%	81.7%	79.6%	3,121	2,941	2,511
Asian alone (NH)	0%	0%	0.1%	0	1	2
Pacific Islander alone (NH)	0%	0.1%	0%	0	2	0
Other race alone (NH)	0%	0%	0%	1	0	0
Multiracial (NH)	3.6%	2.1%	1.8%	138	76	57
Hispanic/Latino (any race)	1.4%	1.8%	1.1%	55	66	34

=== 2020 census ===
As of the 2020 census, Pearl River had a population of 3,822. The median age was 28.3 years. 35.8% of residents were under the age of 18 and 8.8% of residents were 65 years of age or older. For every 100 females, there were 89.6 males, and for every 100 females age 18 and over there were 82.8 males age 18 and over.

0.0% of residents lived in urban areas, while 100.0% lived in rural areas.

There were 1,012 households in Pearl River, of which 53.4% had children under the age of 18 living in them. Of all households, 26.8% were married-couple households, 20.9% were households with a male householder and no spouse or partner present, and 41.3% were households with a female householder and no spouse or partner present. About 19.0% of all households were made up of individuals and 6.2% had someone living alone who was 65 years of age or older. There were 793 families residing in the CDP.

There were 1,056 housing units, of which 4.2% were vacant. The homeowner vacancy rate was 0.0% and the rental vacancy rate was 1.0%.

The most reported detailed ancestries in 2020 were:

- Mississippi Band of Choctaw Indians (58.1%)
- Choctaw (20%)
- English (2.7%)
- African American (2%)
- Irish (1.8%)
- Mexican (1.4%)
- German (0.7%)
- Navajo (0.7%)

=== 2000 census ===
As of the census of 2000, there were 3,156 people, 803 households, and 655 families residing in the CDP. The population density was 102.7 inhabitants per square mile (39.7/km^{2}). There were 838 housing units at an average density of 27.3 per square mile (10.5/km^{2}). The racial makeup of the CDP was 16.25% White, 1.43% African American, 80.35% Native American, 0.06% Asian, 0.10% from other races, and 1.81% from two or more races. Hispanic or Latino of any race were 1.08% of the population.

There were 803 households, out of which 50.8% had children under the age of 18 living with them, 43.0% were married couples living together, 28.0% had a female householder with no husband present, and 18.4% were non-families. 13.8% of all households were made up of individuals, and 3.0% had someone living alone who was 65 years of age or older. The average household size was 3.58 and the average family size was 3.87.

In the CDP, the population was spread out, with 39.3% under the age of 18, 10.8% from 18 to 24, 26.4% from 25 to 44, 15.1% from 45 to 64, and 8.5% who were 65 years of age or older. The median age was 25 years. For every 100 females, there were 92.6 males. For every 100 females age 18 and over, there were 98.4 males.

The median income for a household in the CDP was $26,352, and the median income for a family was $26,348. Males had a median income of $22,295 versus $19,167 for females. The per capita income for the CDP was $8,544. About 26.9% of families and 28.5% of the population were below the poverty line, including 28.3% of those under age 18 and 21.6% of those age 65 or over.

== Education ==
Pearl River is served by the Neshoba County School District.

Native American students are eligible to attend schools in the Choctaw Tribal School System, a tribal school system operated by the Mississippi Band of Choctaw Indians.

Tribal schools in the CDP include:

- Pearl River Elementary School
- Choctaw Central Middle School
- Choctaw Central High School

East Central Community College is the community college of Neshoba County.
