= Neshoba County School District =

School district in Mississippi

The Neshoba County School District is a public school district based in Neshoba County, Mississippi (USA). The district headquarters are in Philadelphia, Mississippi. The district's physical boundaries include Pearl River and Tucker, the Neshoba County portion of Bogue Chitto, and a small portion of Philadelphia. The tribal public schools in Pearl River, Tucker, and Bogue Chitto are not operated by the Neshoba County School district but by the Choctaw Tribal School System, an entity owned and operated by the sovereign nation of the Mississippi Band of Choctaw Indians.

== History ==
Before 1970, a dual system of schools was maintained: one system for white students, and another for non-whites. In the late 1920s, the first school for black children in Philadelphia, the Neshoba County School met in the Black Masonic Lodge on the east side of the railroad track along Rea Street. In 1939 the Rosenwald foundation assisted in financing a new school, which was renamed the Neshoba County Training School. In 1948 a new building was built and adopted the name Booker T. Washington School. This school closed when the schools were integrated in 1970.

In 1928, a group of black farmers organized a club to build the first black high school, on country road 553 in Hopewell. Each of the black families donated an acre of cotton, R.H. Molpus a lumber dealer, obtained materials. The white county agent supervised the cotton project to ensure consistency. Additional funds were provided by the Rosenwald Foundation. In 1929, a Jeanes teacher from the Negro Rural School Fund arrived. In 1936 funds were obtained by the county to expand the school to 8 months a year. In 1963, the Hopewell School was replaced by the county with a single high school for all black children in the county, which was named George Washington Carver High School.

In 1965, Thelma Moore became the first black student to attend Neshoba County High School. After one year, she returned to George Washington Carver High School because of the difficulties faced in attending an integrated school. In 1970, due to federally mandated integration, the school was closed and the black students attended Neshoba Central High School alongside white students.

== Schools ==
- Neshoba Central High School
- Neshoba Central Middle School
- Neshoba Central Elementary School

== Demographics ==
=== 2006-07 school year ===
There were a total of 3,079 students enrolled in the Neshoba County School District during the 2006–2007 school year. The gender makeup of the district was 51% female and 49% male. The racial makeup of the district was 20.88% African American, 69.28% White, 8.77% Native American, 0.75% Hispanic, and 0.32% Asian. 45.6% of the district's students were eligible to receive free lunch.

=== Previous school years ===
School Year	Enrollment	Gender Makeup		Racial Makeup				
School Year	Enrollment	Female	Male	Asian	African American	Hispanic	Native American	White
2005-06	3,097	51%	49%	0.39%	20.08%	0.58%	8.27%	70.68%
2004-05	3,019	51%	49%	0.33%	19.64%	0.63%	7.92%	71.48%
2003-04	2,975	51%	49%	0.20%	19.19%	0.37%	7.56%	72.67%
2002-03	2,866	51%	49%	0.31%	19.89%	0.21%	7.43%	72.16%

== Accountability statistics ==
	2006-07	2005-06	2004-05	2003-04	2002-03
District Accreditation Status	Accredited	Accredited	Accredited	Accredited	Accredited
School Performance Classifications
Level 5 (Superior Performing) Schools	1	0	0	0	0
Level 4 (Exemplary) Schools	2	3	0	3	1
Level 3 (Successful) Schools	0	0	3	0	2
Level 2 (Under Performing) Schools	0	0	0	0	0
Level 1 (Low Performing) Schools	0	0	0	0	0
Not Assigned	0	0	0	0	0

== See also ==
- List of school districts in Mississippi
