= Marcus Dupree =

American football player and professional wrestler (born 1964)

No. 22, 34
- Position: Running back

Personal information
- Born: May 22, 1964 (age 62); Philadelphia, Mississippi, U.S.
- Listed height: 6 ft 3 in (1.91 m)
- Listed weight: 229 lb (104 kg)

Career information
- High school: Philadelphia (MS)
- College: Oklahoma
- NFL draft: 1986: 12th round, 327th overall pick

Career history
- New Orleans / Portland Breakers (1984–1985); Los Angeles Rams (1990–1991)

Awards and highlights
- Third-team All-American (1982); First-team All-Big Eight (1982)

Career NFL statistics
- Rushing yards: 251
- Rushing average: 3.7
- Rushing touchdowns: 1
- Stats at Pro Football Reference

Marcus L. Dupree (born May 22, 1964) is an American former professional football player who was a running back in the United States Football League (USFL) and National Football League (NFL).

Born and raised in Philadelphia, Mississippi, Dupree's play in high school attracted national attention. A highly touted and sought-after college football recruit, he played for the Oklahoma Sooners, earning Football News Freshman of the Year, second-team All-American and Big Eight Conference Newcomer of the Year honors. He left in the middle of his sophomore season and briefly attended the University of Southern Mississippi. Dupree played spring football for the Golden Eagles and finished college at the university.

Dupree joined the USFL the following season and signed with the New Orleans Breakers in 1984. He played for the Breakers for two seasons before a knee injury forced him to leave the game. He returned to professional football in 1990, playing in 15 games over two seasons in the NFL for the Los Angeles Rams before being waived prior to the 1992 season.

== Early life ==
Marcus L. Dupree was born on May 22, 1964, in Philadelphia, Mississippi. He attended Philadelphia High School, where he played for the Philadelphia Tornadoes high school football team from 1978 to 1981. Dupree also competed in track & field, recording a 4.29 40-yard dash.

As a freshman in 1978, Dupree scored five touchdowns as wide receiver and seven more as a kickoff and punt returner, including a 75-yard kickoff return touchdown on his first play in high school.

As a sophomore in 1979, he was switched to running back and rushed for 1,850 yards and scored 28 touchdowns. He also played on Philadelphia High's basketball team, which finished the year with a 33–4 record and reached the semifinals of the Mississippi state basketball tournament, and played first base and catcher for the baseball team, hitting for a .481 average.

As a junior in 1980, he rushed for 2,550 yards and scored 34 touchdowns (25 rushing, 9 by kick return).

As a senior in 1981, he rushed for 2,955 yards and scored 36 touchdowns. He finished his high school career with 7,355 rushing yards with an 8.3-yards-per-carry average. Dupree scored 87 touchdowns total during his playing time in high school, breaking the national high school record (set by Herschel Walker) by one. In 1981, Marcus's final high school football game was played on the Choctaw Indian Reservation's tribal high school's Warriors Stadium. Author Willie Morris described the audience at Dupree's final high school game as "the most distinctive crowds I had ever seen...four thousand or so people seemed almost an equal of mix of whites, blacks, and Indians...After Marcus scored his touchdown, [Sid Salter] saw Cecil Price, Sr. [a Klansman who had been involved in the murders of Chaney, Goodman, and Schwerner during the Civil Rights Movement]. 'He was jumping up and down and cheering as hard as anyone...ain't that a kick in the pants?'"

Dupree was heavily recruited by the major college football programs, and during the final month of the recruiting period, his high school coach, Joe Wood, answered more than 100 phone calls a day from colleges. Oklahoma assistant coach Lucious Selmon spent six weeks in the Downtown Motor Inn in Philadelphia, and after Dupree verbally committed to Fred Akers and the Texas Longhorns while on his visit there, OU head coach Barry Switzer sent former Oklahoma Sooner and Heisman Trophy winner Billy Sims to the town by private plane to appeal to Dupree. On February 12, 1982, Dupree announced he would attend Oklahoma instead of the other finalists, Texas, UCLA, and Southern Miss.

== College career ==
When Dupree arrived at the University of Oklahoma in 1982, head coach Barry Switzer said, "He was the best player on the field. Earl Campbell was the only other guy I ever saw who was like that—physically ready, as a true freshman, to be the best player on a great college team. Maybe even ready for the NFL at that age."

After the first three games of the season, Dupree had just twelve carries for 20 yards and the Sooners' record was 1–2. For the fourth game Switzer abandoned his favored wishbone offense and made Dupree the tailback in the I formation to take advantage of his skills. Dupree scored his first college touchdown against Texas on a 63-yard fake reverse.

On October 16, 1982, he ran for 158 yards against Kansas, including a 75-yard touchdown run. As a result, he was given the starting tailback position over Stanley Wilson and was named Big Eight Offensive Player of the Week. He made his first start against Oklahoma State and scored two touchdowns. Among all his other great runs, he also had a 77-yard punt return against Colorado, an 80-yard run against Kansas State, a 70-yard run against Missouri and an 86-yard run against Nebraska.

Despite not starting until the seventh game of the season, Dupree finished with 1,144 yards rushing and 13 touchdowns. He was named second-team All-American, first-team all-Big Eight Conference and Big Eight Newcomer of the Year.

On January 1, 1983, Dupree's freshman season ended with a 32-21 Fiesta Bowl loss against Arizona State. Coming back from Christmas break, he was out of shape and 10–15 pounds overweight, for which Switzer publicly criticized him. He had to leave the game several times, participating in only 34 offensive plays. Even with these setbacks, he still managed to run the ball 17 times for a Fiesta Bowl record 239 yards, a record that still stands today. Switzer told Dupree, "If you'd have been in shape, you'd have rushed for 400 yards, and we'd have won the game."

Dupree's much-anticipated sophomore season did not turn out as planned. He reported to campus late, missed the team photo and put on considerable weight. Although Switzer was known for running a loose ship, Dupree's lackadaisical attitude was too much for him, and he called Dupree "lazy." Hampered by injuries, Dupree gained 369 yards on 61 carries with three touchdowns while playing in four of the first five games of the season. After suffering a concussion in a loss against Texas, he vanished for a week. When he resurfaced in Mississippi, he announced he was leaving OU and transferring to the University of Southern Mississippi. Upon being informed that because of NCAA rules, he would have to sit out both the remainder of the 1983 season and the 1984 season, he left after three months.

For every Marcus Allen, Barry Sanders or Emmitt Smith, there's an Anthony Thompson, a Paul Palmer and a LeShon Johnson, guys who never matched their college success in the NFL. Some of the unfortunate ones were too small. Others were just a step too slow. But you'll also find a select few individuals who had all the tools. They're the ones who didn't achieve NFL success for reasons of circumstance. Such was the case with Marcus Dupree, a star running back who lit the college football scene on fire as a freshman in 1982.

— Marc Connolly, ABC Sports Online

=== Statistics ===
Season	Rushing					Receiving				
Season	Att	Yds	Avg	Lng	TD	Rec	Yds	Avg	Lng	TD
1982	163	1,393	8.5	86	12	1	23	23.0	23	0
1983	61	396	6.5	48	3	1	7	7.0	7	0
Totals	224	1,789	8.0	86	15	2	30	15.0	23	0

== Professional career ==
=== USFL ===
Dupree was signed by the New Orleans Breakers of the United States Football League in 1984. The upstart league had initially sworn off underclassmen in hopes of appeasing college coaches and officials angered by the blockbuster signing of Herschel Walker after his junior year. However, after a federal judge ruled that the eligibility rule violated antitrust law, the Breakers–who had just moved from Boston–quickly persuaded the New Jersey Generals to give up their territorial rights to Dupree (OU was among the Generals' territorial schools) in return for their first-round pick in the 1985 USFL draft.

He scored a touchdown on his first professional possession. Throughout the year, he was injured and often was on the bench watching Buford Jordan take his carries. He gained 684 yards on 145 carries with nine touchdowns for a 4.7 yards per carry average. He had two 100-yard rushing games. Breakers fans saw him as a local boy made good; the Superdome was packed with large crowds by USFL standards.

The Breakers moved to Portland, Oregon for the 1985 season. Dupree was late arriving at Breakers' training camp in San Dimas, California that season, but performed well enough to earn a starting position for the season opener at Sun Devil Stadium against the Arizona Outlaws. He got off to a good start, rushing 69 yards on 17 carries with a touchdown. While he was carrying the ball early in the second half, he suffered a severe knee injury and was taken off on a stretcher.

He had surgery on the knee and recuperated in Portland, celebrating his 21st birthday with friends and teammates. However, he would never play another down for the Breakers.

=== NFL ===
After Dupree had been out of football for four years, he met with Walter Payton on some business ventures and Payton urged him to get back into shape to try out for the NFL again in 1990. Dupree agreed and began working out, losing 100 pounds in just over three months and going back to running a 4.3 40-yard dash. In October 1990, Dupree signed with the Los Angeles Rams, who had drafted him in the 12th round of the 1986 NFL draft, in case he became fit again after a five-and-a-half-year absence from the football field. In April that year, he asked his former USFL coach, Dick Coury, then the quarterbacks coach for the Rams, if he could work out for the team if he got into shape, and impressed Coury and head coach John Robinson enough to earn a contract. Dupree was placed on injured reserve, meaning he would have to sit out for four weeks before he could play for the Rams.

During week nine of the 1990 season, Dupree made his first appearance and rushed for 22 yards on four carries, wearing number 34 in honor of Payton instead of his usual 22. He started his first game in week 16 and rushed for 42 yards on 13 carries. He finished his first NFL season with 72 yards on 19 carries, in three games played.

In 1991, Dupree missed the first seven games due to a toe injury suffered in practice. Returning in week 8, he played more often and scored his only NFL touchdown that year. He finished the season with 179 yards on 49 carries with one touchdown, in eight games played.

The San Francisco 49ers brought Dupree into training camp in 1992 to play fullback, a position he had never played.

Before the 1992 season, Dupree led the Rams in rushing in the preseason, which included a 100-yard game in the final preseason game against the Los Angeles Raiders, but was one of the 14 players cut by coach Chuck Knox to trim the team down to the 47-player regular-season roster, and he retired shortly afterward. Knox, who had replaced John Robinson earlier that year, had told Dupree and the press that Dupree was not versatile enough for his one-back offense. He said he preferred running backs who "were a little more well-rounded, could catch the ball coming out of the backfield and could do some of the other things besides run with the football."

He finished his career with 251 yards on 68 carries during regular season play, for a 3.7 yards-per-carry average, rushing for one touchdown.

== Career statistics ==
=== USFL statistics ===
Year	Team	Rushing					Receiving			
Year	Team	Att	Yds	Avg	Lng	TD	Rec	Yds	Avg	TD
1984	New Orleans Breakers	145	684	4.7	59	9	28	182	6.5	0
1985	Portland Breakers	17	69	4.1	—	1	2	7	3.5	0
Career		162	753	4.6	59	10	30	189	6.3	0

=== NFL statistics ===
Year	Team	Rushing					Receiving				
Year	Team	Att	Yds	Avg	Lng	TD	Rec	Yds	Avg	Lng	TD
1990	LAR	19	72	3.8	13	0	0	0	0.0	0	0
1991	LAR	49	179	3.7	24	1	6	46	7.7	21	0
Career		68	251	3.7	24	1	6	46	7.7	21	0

== Post-football life ==
After he was released by the Rams, Dupree performed as a professional wrestler for the USWA in 1995. He also ran a sports bar and worked as a casino-greeter for a short period of time.

In 2011, Dupree was diagnosed with prostate cancer but recovered. Earlier in 2011, he was running a pro wrestling promotion organization, called Mid South Wrestling. Dupree is also a licensed truck driver with OTR experience.

He later was found to have had a role in the Mississippi welfare funds scandal.

== Personal life ==
Dupree has three sons, Marquez, Landon and Rashad. He also has a grandson.

== Representation in other media ==
- Willie Morris' book titled The Courting of Marcus Dupree explored colleges' recruiting Dupree to play.
- ESPN had a film documentary on Dupree, titled "The Best That Never Was" (2010), directed by Jonathan Hock. It aired on November 9, 2010, as part of the 30 for 30 series of 30 films celebrating ESPN's 30th anniversary.
- [Clarion-Ledger] On March 13, 2020, an article in the Jackson Mississippi newspaper Clarion-Ledger identified $104,974 in allegedly misappropriated TANF (Temporary Assistance to Needy Families) that was paid to Dupree for his role as a spokesperson for the charity Families First. These and other payments are now under criminal investigation.
