= Pearl River (Mississippi–Louisiana) =

River in the Southern United States

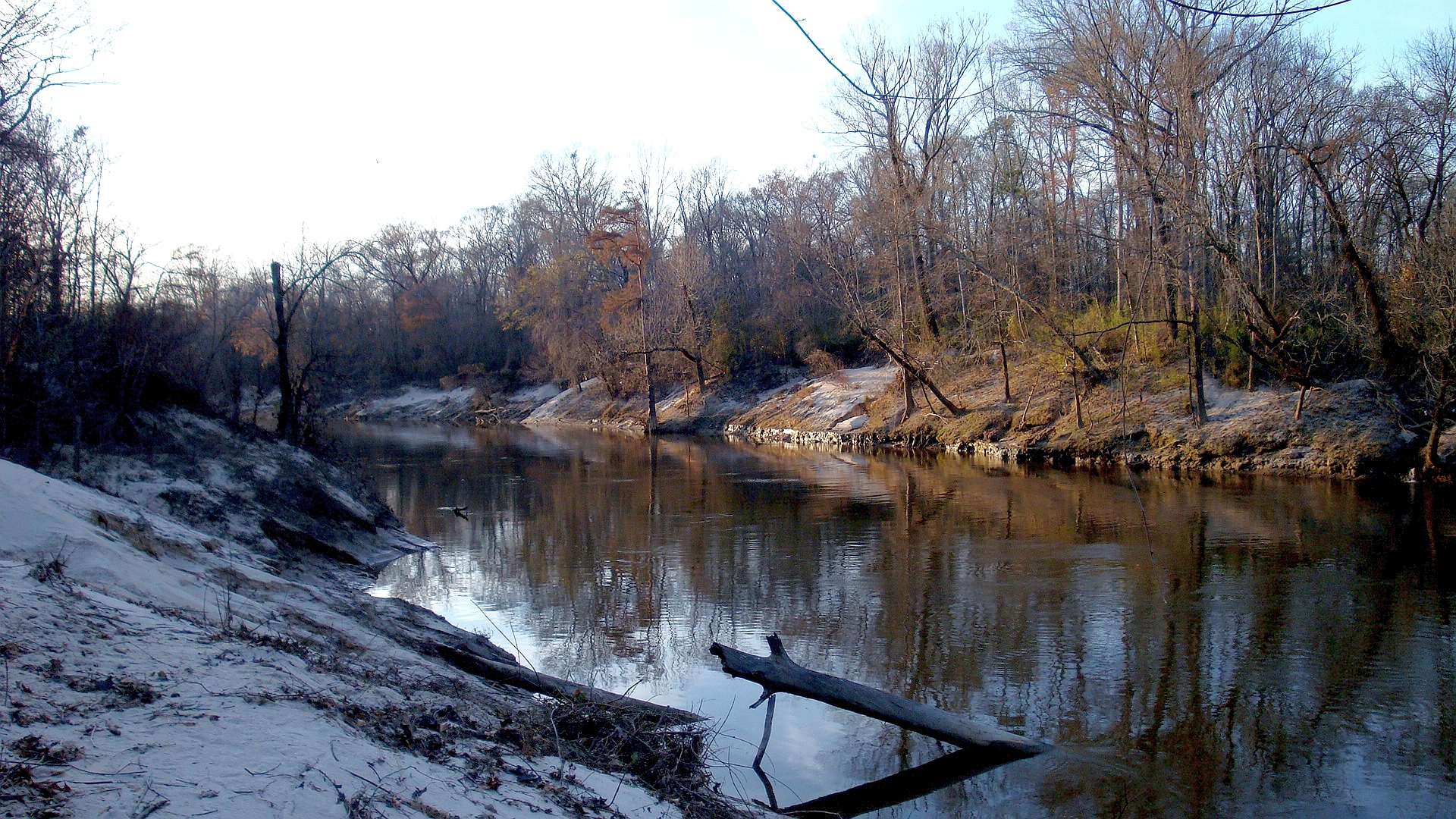
- The Pearl River in Hinds County, Mississippi
- Pearl River

Location
- Country: United States
- States: Mississippi; Louisiana
- Counties: Hinds; Rankin; Copiah; Simpson; Lawrence; Marion; Pearl River; Hancock
- Parishes: Washington; St. Tammany

Physical characteristics
- Source
  - location: Neshoba County, Mississippi
  - coordinates: 32°53′56″N 89°00′53″W
  - elevation: 400 feet (120 m)
- Mouth
  - location: Lake Borgne
  - coordinates: 30°10′46″N 89°31′34″W
- Length: 444 miles (715 km)
- Basin size: 8,760 square miles (22,700 km^{2})

The Pearl River is a blackwater river in the U.S. states of Mississippi and Louisiana. It forms in Neshoba County, Mississippi, from the confluence of Nanih Waiya and Tallahaga creeks, and has a meander length of 444 miles (715 km). The lower part of the river forms part of the boundary between Mississippi and Louisiana.

The river watershed contains large areas of bottomland hardwood swamp and cypress swamp, providing habitat for many species of wildlife, including sturgeon and black bears. As recently as 2008, the endangered Ivory-billed woodpecker was reportedly sighted here. The mouth of the river creates important marsh habitat along salinity gradients, which has been the subject of many scientific studies. It is considered to be one of the most critical areas of natural habitat remaining in Louisiana.

Mississippi's capital and largest city, Jackson, is located along the upper reaches of the river. Most of the towns along the river, starting with Philadelphia, Mississippi, in the north, are within the boundaries of that state.

== Tributaries and hydrology ==
The Yockanookany and Strong rivers are tributaries on the upper section of the river north of Jackson: the Lobutcha, Tuscolameta, and Pelahatchie creeks also feed in as tributaries in this region. In 1924 the Tuscolameta Creek received 24-mile channelization and Yockanookany River received a 36-mile canal, which was completed in 1928.

Northeast of Jackson, the Ross Barnett Reservoir was formed by a 1962 dam. Average annual rainfall is about 52 inches in the upper third of the basin, and below Jackson the basin rainfall increases to 64 inches or more, contributing to the greater discharge of the Bogue Chitto as noted below.

The Bogue Chitto River is a major tributary on the lower section. The Bogue Chitto's mean low-water discharge to the lower river is nearly six times that of the mean low-water discharge of the Pearl River at Jackson, Mississippi, according to a 1936 government report of the Mississippi Planning Commission.

West of Picayune, about 50 miles (80 km) above the mouth, the river forks.

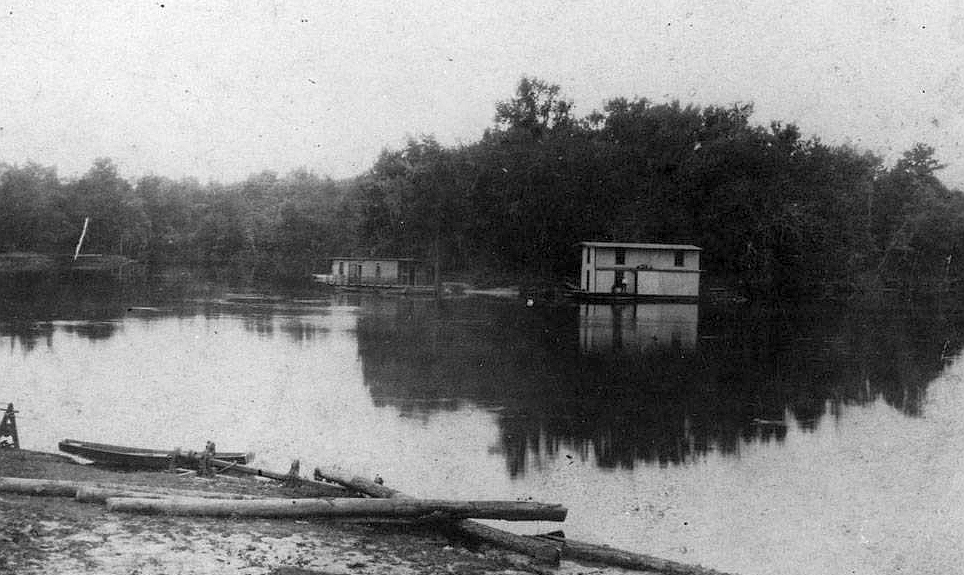
Floating saloons on the Pearl River. The "Blue Goose" (left) and "Freeman Saloon" (center), near Old Gainesville, Hancock County, Mississippi, 1907.

The East Pearl River empties into Lake Borgne, where the dredged Pearl River Channel meets the Gulf Intracoastal Waterway. The discharge flows eastward past Grand Island through St. Joe Pass and into the Mississippi Sound. The West Pearl River flows into The Rigolets, thence into Lake Borgne. Both discharges eventually reach the Gulf of Mexico. The Pearl River serves as the 115-mile (185 km) boundary between Mississippi and Louisiana in its lower reach near the Gulf of Mexico.

Pearl River provides the receiving waters for the Savanna Street Sewage Treatment Plant in Jackson, Mississippi. which lies about 180 miles (290 km) from the mouth of the river. The river below Jackson has historically suffered from pollution from municipal and industrial sources, however the waters are home to the ringed sawback turtle.

== Towns on the river ==
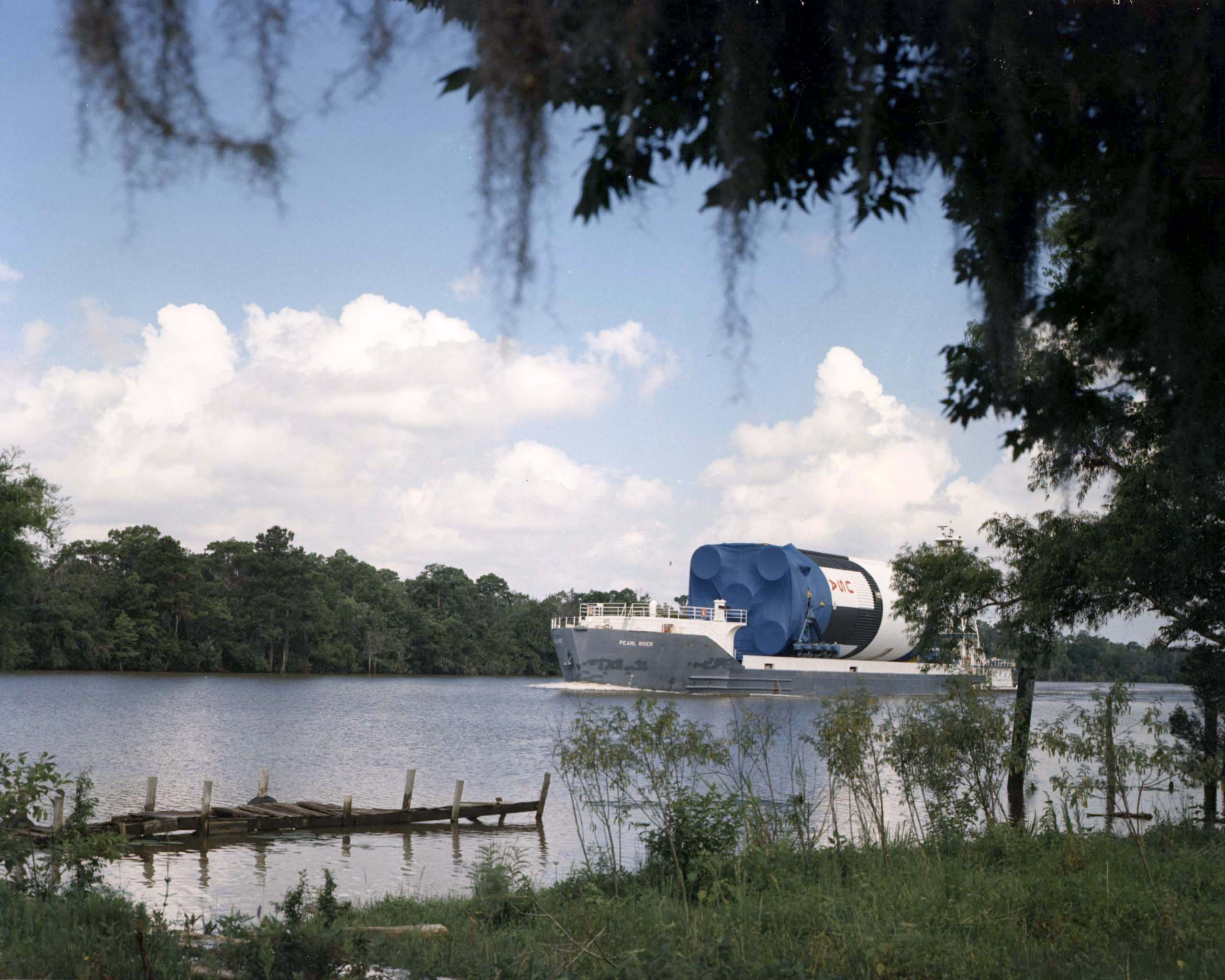
A Saturn V first stage is transported by the barge Pearl River down the East Pearl River on its way from Stennis Space Center, then named the National Space Technology Laboratories, to Florida for launch.

The following towns (in order, north to south) developed on or near the Pearl River:

- Philadelphia, Mississippi
- Pearl River, Mississippi - named after the river.
- Carthage, Mississippi
- Jackson, Mississippi
- Flowood, Mississippi
- Pearl, Mississippi - named after the river.
- Georgetown, Mississippi
- Rockport, Mississippi
- Monticello, Mississippi
- Columbia, Mississippi
- Bogalusa, Louisiana
- Picayune, Mississippi
- Pearlington, Mississippi - named after the river.
- Pearl River, Louisiana - named after the river.

== Navigation ==
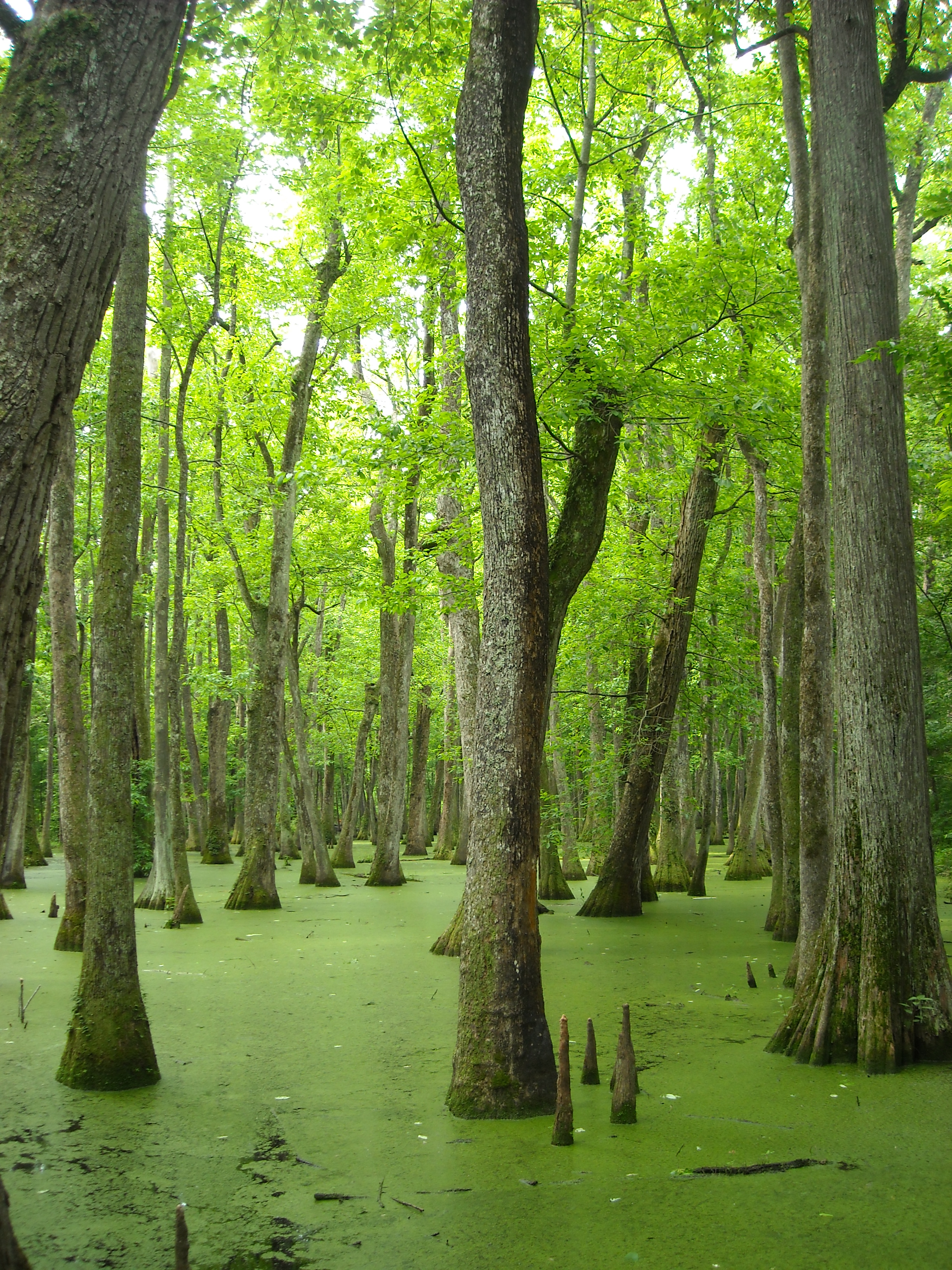
Pearl River

The lower river was navigable from Brashear's Stand on the Natchez Trace to the mouth. For the year 1827 the enrolled and licensed tonnage for Pearl River shipping was 750 tons. The customhouse at Pearl River which was ten miles inland at the small town of Pearlington, Mississippi was later changed, but in 1904 the district reported a total of 358 vessels and 19,869 tons. The U.S. Army Corps of Engineers has undertaken three significant navigation projects in the Pearl River Basin. In 1880, Congress authorized a 5-foot (1.5 m) navigation channel on the West Pearl River from Jackson to the Rigolets. That project was discontinued in 1922. Beginning in 1910, a channel was dredged from the mouth of the East Pearl River into Lake Borgne, a project which is maintained on an irregular basis. In 1935, the West Pearl River Navigation Project was authorized. It provided for a navigation channel from Bogalusa to the mouth of the West Pearl River. The project includes a canal with three locks. The Corps of Engineers placed the project in "caretaker" status in the 1970s because of a decline in commercial traffic. Maintenance dredging resumed in December 1988. In the 1950s, underwater concrete sills were constructed to help maintain water levels in the navigation channel. This has prevented Gulf sturgeon and other migratory species from accessing upstream areas. A rock ramp was designed in 2003 to help fish navigate over one of the sills, but was never constructed. Environmental groups propose further work to mitigate the effects of the navigation project.

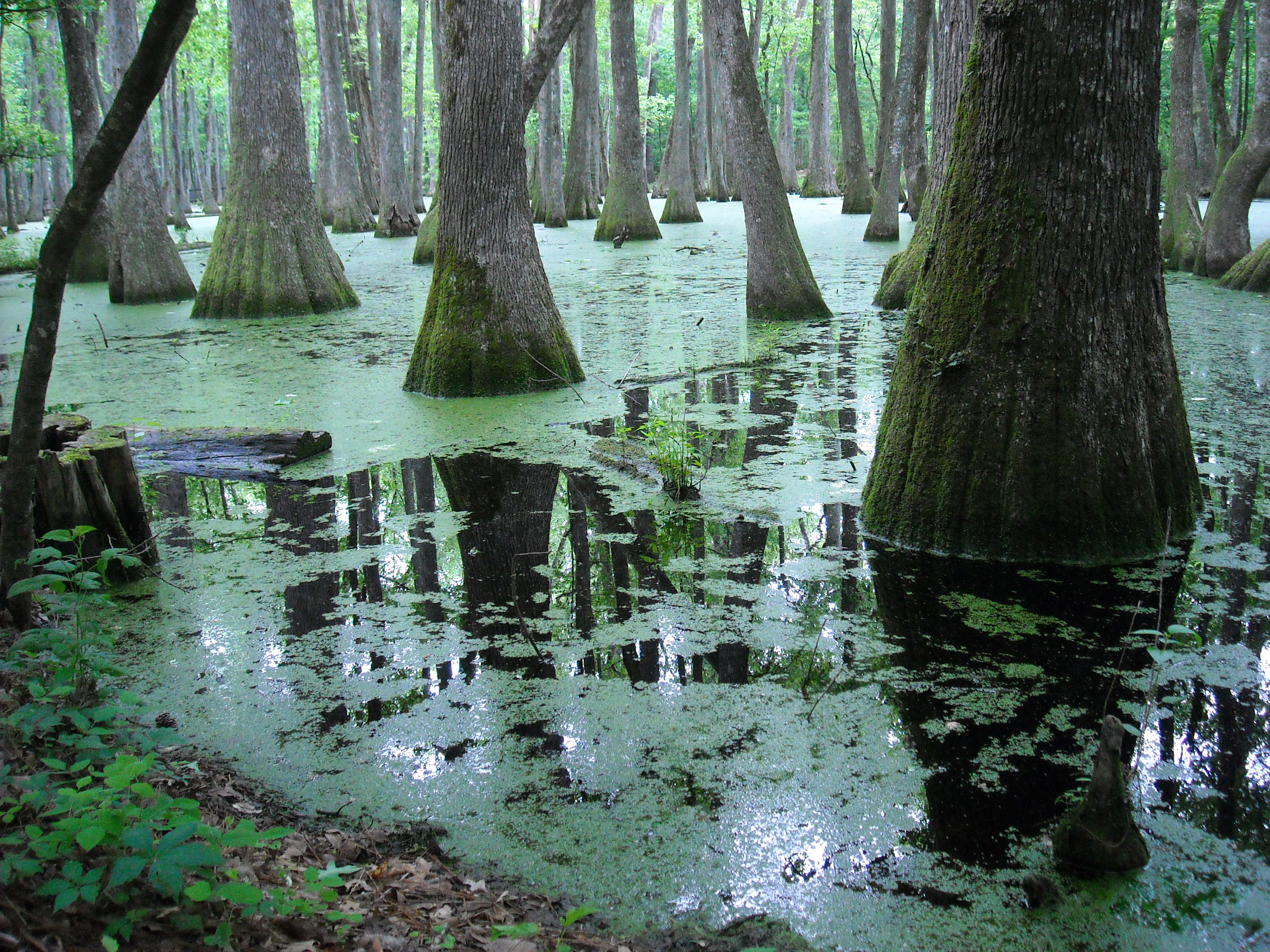
Pearl River backwater in Mississippi

Building dams, canals, levees and water control structures is known to have highly negative effects on wetlands and the ecological services they provide. Increasingly, these artificial structures are being removed to allow natural river activities to resume. The Pascagoula River is one of the few remaining southern rivers with natural water regimes, and is a potential model for restoring the Pearl River floodplain. At the Bogalusa, Louisiana gauge the river was recorded in 1983 and 1987 as delivering nearly 3.5 million metric tons and 2.5 million metric tons of sediment respectively.

== Hurricane effects ==
Hurricanes are a natural form of disturbance that shapes rivers and watersheds on the Gulf Coast, and has done so for thousands of years. As one recent example, Hurricane Katrina on August 29, 2005, caused further natural changes in the Pearl River. Bottom sediments and marsh vegetation—including uprooted cypress and oak trees—blocked the mouth of the West Pearl and other parts of the channel. The Louisiana Department of Wildlife & Fisheries and other agencies removed 27,000 cubic meters (35,000 yd^{3}) of debris. However, the accumulation of this woody debris is a natural part of floodplain ecosystems in general, and wetlands in particular, and provides vital habitat for species including fish and turtles. Hence, this use of state funds to remove debris was an expenditure on an activity that is known to have negative impacts upon watersheds and wild species.

== History ==
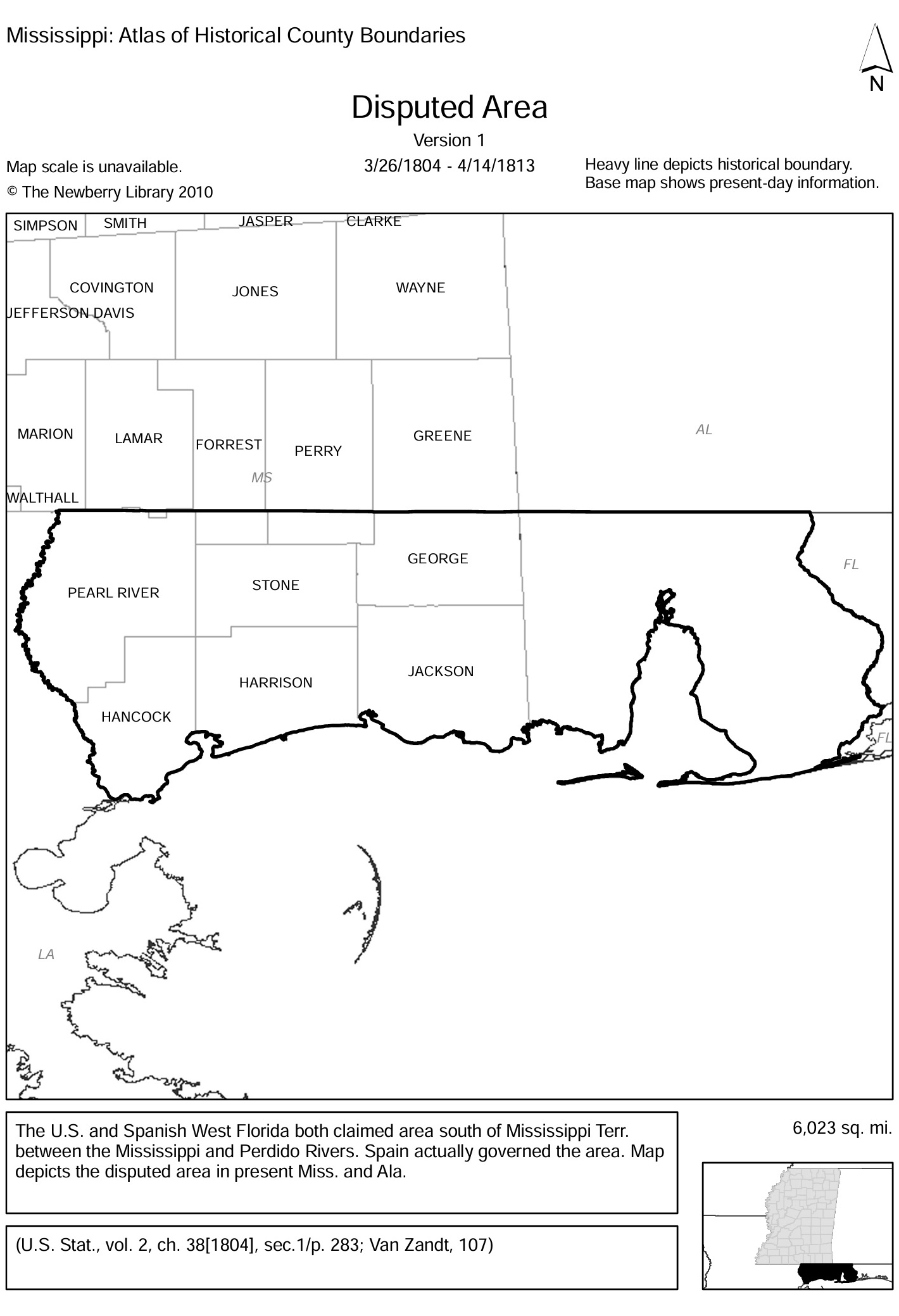
Contemporary Mississippi county boundaries within the Mississippi and Alabama section of the west Florida disputed strip (present-day Louisiana section not pictured)

Following the Louisiana Purchase a number of houses were built on the East Pearl River; historians speculate when Thomas Jefferson outlawed the slave trade in the Orleans Territory, slave traders moved to Spanish-controlled Pearl, the next major navigable river east of the U.S.-controlled Mississippi.

As of 1812, the land between the Pearl River and the Perdido River below the 31st parallel was legally transferred to the United States from Spain.

== See also ==
- List of rivers of Louisiana
- List of rivers of Mississippi
- 1979 Easter flood
- South Atlantic-Gulf Water Resource Region
