= History of the Choctaw =

History of Native American people

The History of the Choctaws recounts the experiences of the Choctaw people, Native Americans originally from Mississippi and Alabama Southeastern United States. Some migrated into Louisiana, while many were forcibly removed west into Indian Territory. Today, the Choctaw tribes are headquartered in Mississippi, Louisiana, and Oklahoma.

== Precontact history ==
=== Origins ===
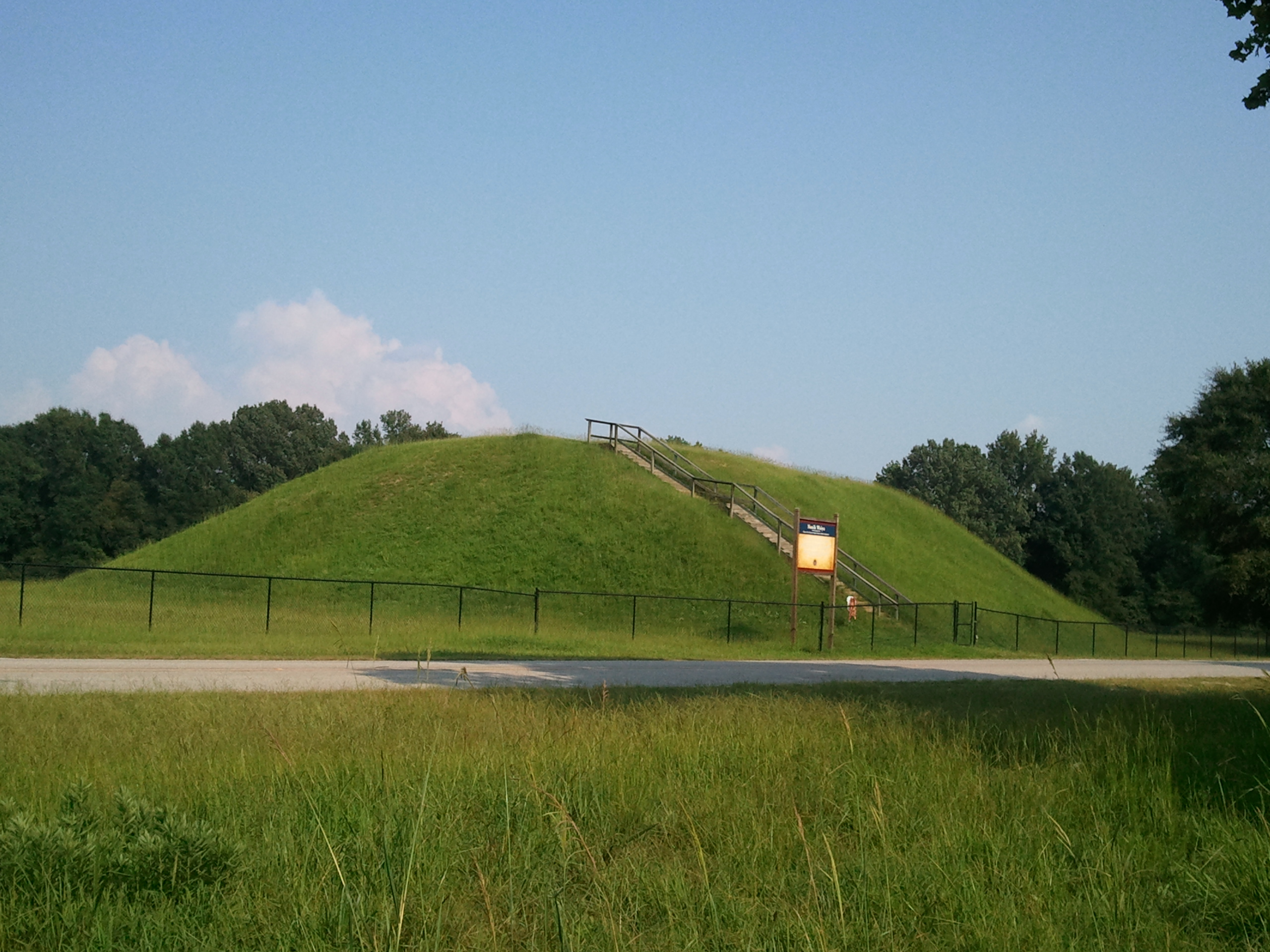
Nanih Waiya, "the leaning mound," mother mound for the Choctaw people

One Choctaw origin story relates how in precontact times the Choctaw people migrated from the West along with the Chickasaw. Linguists estimate that the Choctaw and Chickasaw broke away from their Muskogean parent stock circa 800 CE.

Another oral history explains how Choctaw people originated from the Nanih Waiya Cave near Nanih Waiya, "the leaning mound," a platform mound on the Pearl River near Noxapater, Mississippi.

=== Mississippian culture ===
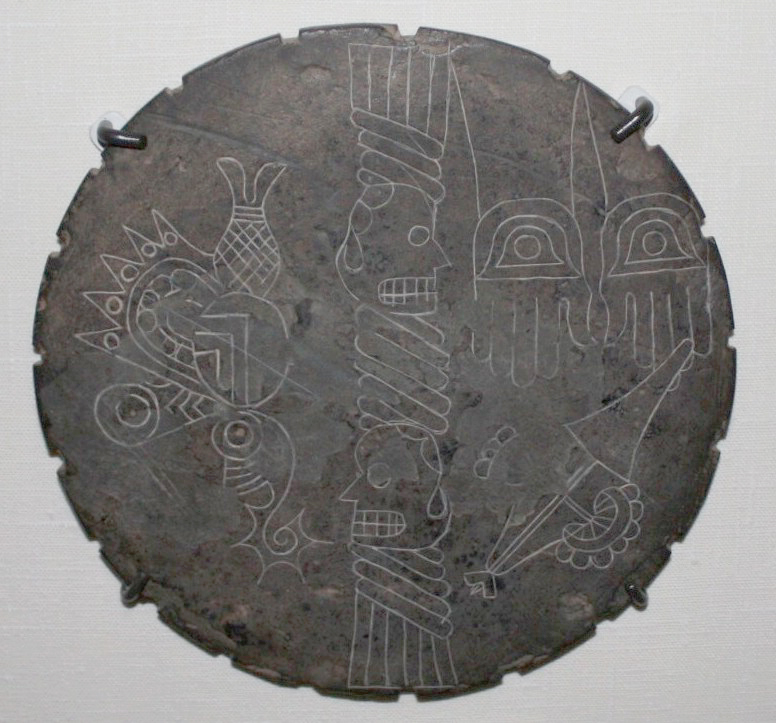
The Willoughby Disk, a Mississippian ceremonial stone palette from Moundville Archaeological Park, housed onsite in the Jones Archaeological Museum. Photo by Jeffrey Reed.

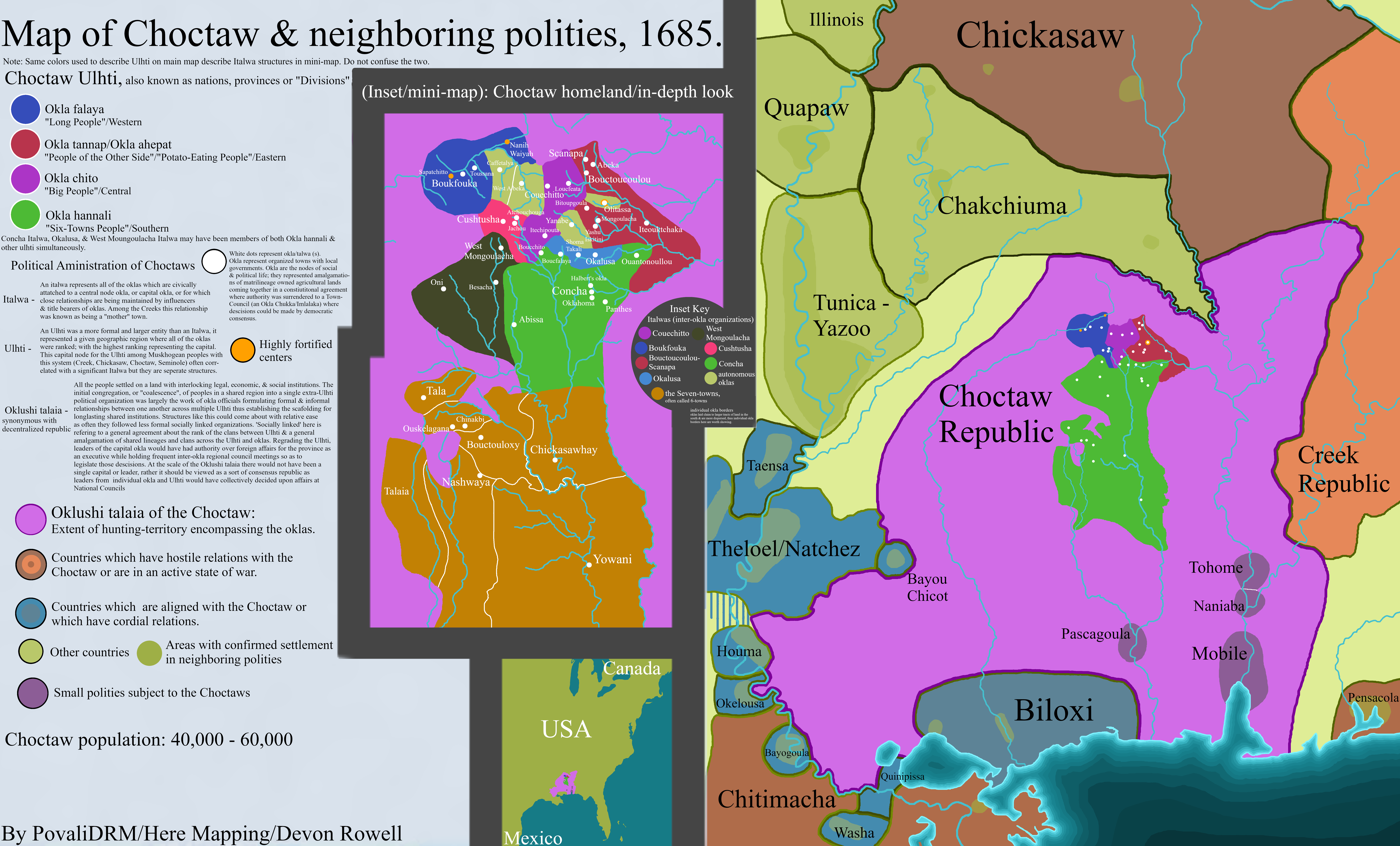
Map displaying the internal and immediate external political situation of the Choctaw Nation in 1685

During the Mississippian era around 800 to 1500 CE, some ancestral Choctaw, Chickasaw, and Chakchiuma peoples may have been part of Moundville, the second-largest polity in the Mississippian era. Located in central Alabama, the polity flourished from circa 1000 to 1450 CE. As Moundville began to fracture in the 15th century, Proto-Choctaw people migrated south and began the Burial Urn culture. They dispersed with many living along the Black Prairie zone, an arc of fertile lands in Alabama, and into western Mississippi.

The Mississippian Ideological Interaction Sphere was religious, cultural, and trade network, centered along the Mississippi river valley and spanning much of the Midwestern, Eastern, and Southeastern United States.

When the Spanish made their first forays inland in the 16th century from the shores of the Gulf of Mexico, they encountered some chiefdoms of the Mississippians.

=== Contact era ===
After the castaway Cabeza de Vaca of the ill-fated Narváez expedition returned to Spain, he described to the Court that the New World was the "richest country in the world." It commissioned the Spaniard Hernando de Soto to lead the first expedition into the interior of the North American continent. De Soto, convinced of the "riches", wanted Cabeza de Vaca to accompany him on the expedition. Cabeza de Vaca declined because of a payment dispute. From 1540 to 1543, Hernando de Soto traveled through present-day Florida and Georgia, and then into the Alabama and Mississippi areas that would later be inhabited by the Choctaw.

De Soto had the best-equipped militia at the time. As the brutalities of the de Soto expedition through the Southeast became known, ancestors to the Choctaw rose in defense. The Battle of Mabila, an ambush arranged by Chief Tuskaloosa, was a turning point for the de Soto venture. The battle "broke the back" of the campaign, and they never fully recovered.

Hernando de Soto, leading his well-equipped Spanish fortune hunters, made contact with the Choctaws in the year 1540. He had been one of a triumvirate which wrecked and plundered the Inca empire and, as a result, was one of the wealthiest men of his time. His invading army lacked nothing in equipage. In true conquistador style, he took as hostage a chief named Chief Tuskaloosa, demanding of him carriers and women. The carriers he got at once. The women, Tuscaloosa said, would be waiting in Mabila (Mobile). The chief neglected to mention that he had also summoned his warriors to be waiting in Mabila. On October 18, 1540, de Soto entered the town and received a gracious welcome. The Choctaws feasted with him, danced for him, then attacked him.

— Bob Ferguson-Choctaw Chronology

== History ==
=== 17th century emergence ===
The archaeological record for the period between 1567 and 1699 is not complete or well-studied. It appears that some Mississippian settlements were abandoned well before the 17th century. Similarities in pottery coloring and burials suggest the following scenario for the emergence of the distinctive Choctaw society.

According to Patricia Galloway, the Choctaw region of Mississippi, generally located between the Yazoo basin to the north and the Natchez bluffs to the south, was slowly occupied by Burial Urn people from the Bottle Creek Indian Mounds area in the Mobile, Alabama, delta. They were joined by remnants of people from Moundville (around present-day Tuscaloosa, Alabama), which had started fracturing some years before. Facing severe depopulation, these groups moved westward, where they combined with the Plaquemine and a group of "prairie people" living near the area. When this occurred is not clear. In the space of several generations and the process of ethnogenesis, they developed a new society which became known as Choctaw (albeit with a strong Mississippian background).

Other scholars note the Choctaw oral history recounts their long migration to the Mississippi area from west of the Mississippi River.

In 1718 the French renamed Bulbancha which means "place of many tongues" in Choctaw to the city New Orleans after Phillip II Duke of Orléans.

The contemporary historian Patricia Galloway argues from fragmentary archaeological and cartographic evidence that the Choctaw did not exist as a unified culture before the 17th century. Only then did various southeastern peoples, remnants of Moundville, Plaquemine, and other Mississippian cultures, coalesce to form a self-consciously Choctaw people. The historical homeland of the Choctaw, or of the peoples from whom the Choctaw nation arose, included the area of Nanih Waiya, an earthwork mound in present-day Winston County, Mississippi, which they considered sacred ground. Their homeland was bounded by the Tombigbee River to the east, the Pearl River on the north and west, and "the Leaf-Pascagoula system" to the South. This area was mostly uninhabited during the Mississippian -culture period.

While Nanih Waiya mound continued to be a ceremonial center and object of veneration, scholars believe Native Americans traveled to it during the Mississippian culture period. From the 17th century on, the Choctaw occupied this area and revered this site as the center of their origin stories. These included stories of migration to this site from west of the great river (believed to refer to the Mississippi River.)

In Histoire de La Louisiane (Paris, 1758), French explorer Antoine-Simon Le Page du Pratz recounted that "...when I asked them from whence the Chat-kas [sic] came, to express the suddenness of their appearance they replied that they had come out from under the earth." American scholars later took this as intended to explain the Choctaws' immediate appearance, and not as a literal creation account. It was perhaps the first European writing that included part of the Choctaw origin story.

A people who by many peculiar customs, are very different from the other red men on the continent ... they are the Chactaws [sic], more commonly known by the name of the Flatheads. These people are the only nation from whom I [sic] could learn any idea of a traditional account of a first origin; and that is their coming out of a hole in the ground, which they shew between their nation and the Chicsaws [sic]; they tell us also that their neighbours were surprised at seeing a people rise at once out of the earth.

— Bernard Romans- Natural History of East and West Florida

Early 19th century and contemporary Choctaw storytellers describe that the Choctaw people emerged from either Nanih Waiya mound or cave. A companion story describes their migration journey from the west, beyond the Mississippi River, when they were directed by their leader's use of a sacred red pole.

The Choctaws, a great many winters ago, commenced moving from the country where they then lived, which was a great distance to the west of the great river and the mountains of snow, and they were a great many years on their way. A great medicine man led them the whole way, by going before with a red pole, which he stuck in the ground every night where they encamped. This pole was every morning found leaning to the east, and he told them that they must continue to travel to the east until the pole would stand upright in their encampment, and that there the Great Spirit had directed that they should live.

— George Catlin- Smithsonian Report

==== French colonization (1682) ====
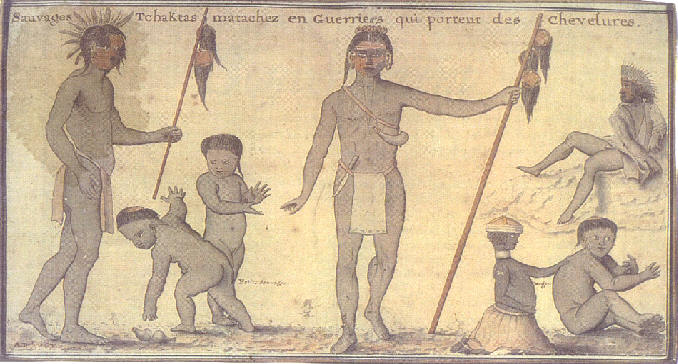
Watercolor painting of Choctaw men, painted for war and holding scalps, and children, by Alexandre de Batz, c. mid–18th century

In 1682 La Salle was the first French explorer to venture into the southeast along the Mississippi River. His expedition did not meet with the Choctaw; it established a post along the Arkansas River to the west of the Mississippi. The post signaled to the English that the French were serious at colonization in the South.

The first direct recorded contact between the Choctaw and the French was with Pierre Le Moyne d'Iberville in 1699. Indirect contact had likely occurred between the Choctaw and English traders through other tribes, including the Muscogee Creek and Chickasaw. The Choctaw, along with other tribes, formed a relationship with French settlers in New France and Louisiana. Illegal fur trading may have led to further unofficial contact. The Choctaw allied with the French primarily to defend against slave raids from Indian tribes allied to English colonists in Carolina such as the Chickasaw.

As the historian Greg O'Brien has noted, the Choctaw developed three distinct political and geographic regions. During the colonial period, these regions sometimes had differing alliances with trading partners among French, Spanish and English colonists, often dependent on geography and the nearest trading partner. They also expressed differences during and after the American Revolutionary War. Their divisions were roughly eastern, western (near present-day Vicksburg, Mississippi) and southern (Six Towns). Each division was headed by a principal chief, and subordinate chiefs led each of the towns within the area. The chiefs met on a National Council, but the society was highly decentralized for some time, and based in town decisionmaking.

Before the Seven Years' War, the French were the main trading partners of the Choctaw, as they had established themselves in the Mobile and New Orleans areas of La Louisiane. The British had primarily colonized along the Atlantic Coast, from which some traders travelled to interior tribes. Trade disputes between the eastern and western divisions contributed to the Choctaw Civil War, which was fought between 1747 and 1750, with the pro-French eastern division emerging victorious.

After being defeated by Great Britain in the Seven Years' War, France ceded its territory east of the Mississippi River to Britain. From 1763 to 1781, Britain was the Choctaw main European trading partner. Spanish forces were based in New Orleans in 1766, after they took over French territory west of the Mississippi. The western Choctaw sometimes traded with them in that area. Spain declared war against Great Britain in 1779, during the American Revolution.

=== United States relations ===
==== American Revolutionary War ====
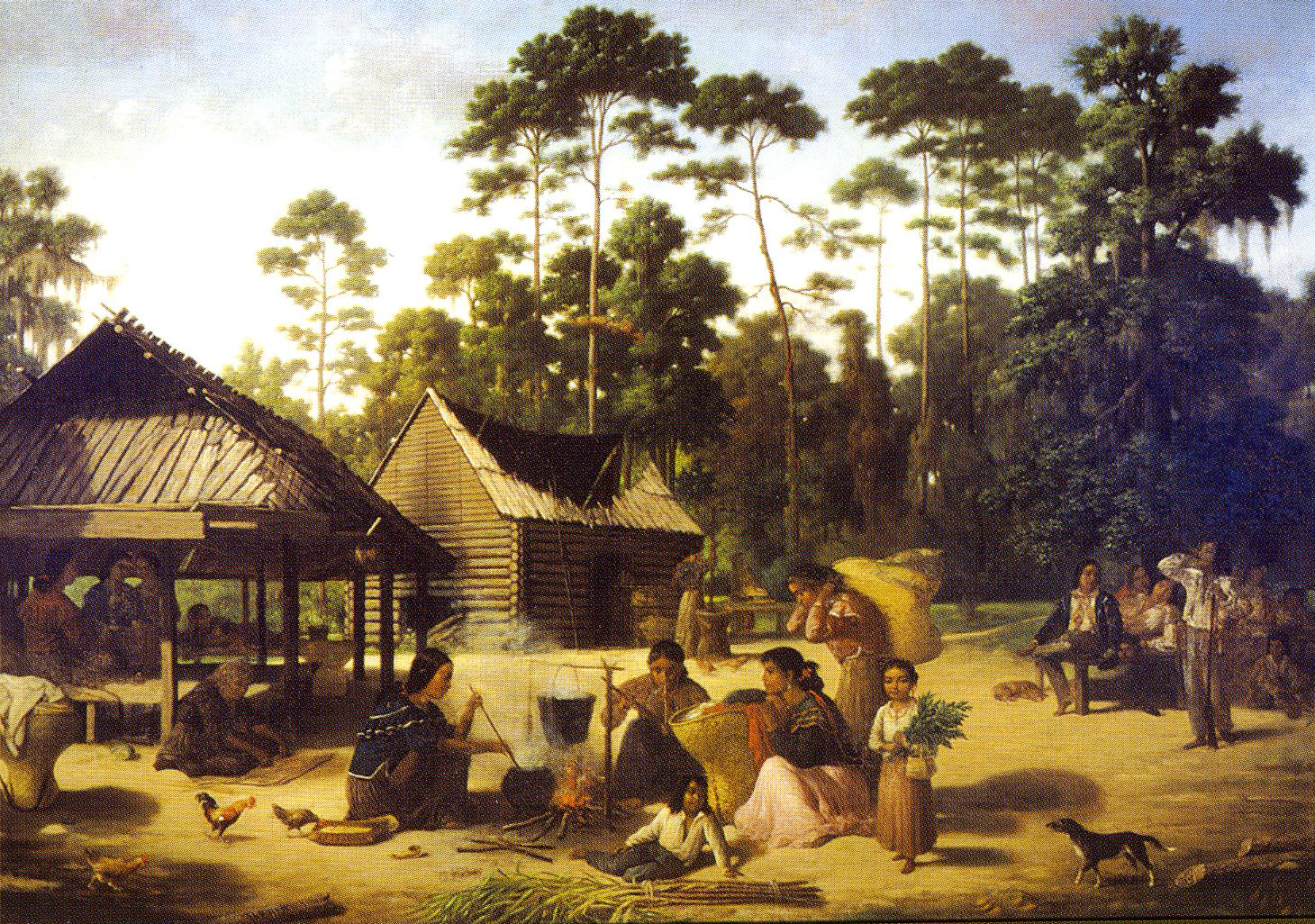
Choctaw Village near the Chefuncte, by Francois Bernard, 1869. (Peabody Museum – Harvard University.) The women are preparing dye to color cane strips for making baskets.

During the American Revolution, the Choctaw bands divided over whether to support Britain or Spain. Some Choctaw warriors from the western and eastern divisions supported the British in the defense of Mobile, Alabama, and Pensacola, Florida. Chief Franchimastabé led a Choctaw war party with British forces against American rebels in Natchez. The Americans had left by the time Franchimastabé arrived, but the Choctaw occupied Natchez for weeks and convinced residents to remain loyal to Britain.

Other Choctaw companies joined Washington's army during the war, and served the entire duration. Bob Ferguson, a Southeastern Indian historian, noted, "[In] 1775 the American Revolution began a period of new alignments for the Choctaws and other southern Indians. Choctaw scouts served under Washington, Morgan, Wayne and Sullivan."

More than 1,000 Choctaw fought for Britain, largely against Spain's campaigns along the Gulf Coast. At the same time, a significant number of Choctaw aided Spain.

==== Post-American Revolutionary War ====
Ferguson wrote that with the end of the Revolution, "'Franchimastabe', Choctaw head chief, went to Savannah, Georgia, to secure American trade." In the next few years, some Choctaw scouts served in Ohio with U.S. General Anthony Wayne in the Northwest Indian War.

George Washington (first U.S. President) and Henry Knox (first U.S. Secretary of War) proposed the cultural transformation of Native Americans. While Washington believed that Native American society was inferior to that of the European Americans, he also recognized the Choctaw and the other Civilized Tribes as equals (an uncommon opinion for American leaders at the time). He formulated a policy to encourage the "civilizing" process, and Thomas Jefferson continued it. Historian Robert Remini wrote, "[T]hey presumed that once the Indians adopted the practice of private property, built homes, farmed, educated their children, and embraced Christianity, these Native Americans would win acceptance from white Americans."

Washington's six-point plan included impartial justice toward Indians; regulated buying of Indian lands; promotion of commerce; promotion of experiments to civilize or improve Indian society; presidential authority to give presents; and punishing those who violated Indian rights. The government appointed agents, such as Benjamin Hawkins, to live among the Southeast Indians and to teach them through example and instruction, how to live like whites. While living among the Choctaw for nearly 30 years, Hawkins married Lavinia Downs, a Choctaw woman.

As the people had a matrilineal kinship system of property and hereditary leadership, their children were considered born into the mother's family and clan, and gained their social status from her people. In the late eighteenth and early nineteenth centuries, numerous Scots-Irish traders also lived among the Choctaw and married high-status women. Choctaw chiefs saw these as strategic alliances to build stronger relationships with the Americans in a changing environment that influenced ideas of capital and property. The children of such marriages were Choctaw, first and foremost. Some of the sons were educated in Anglo-American schools and became important interpreters and negotiators for Choctaw-US relations.

Whereas it hath at this time become peculiarly necessary to warn the citizens of the United States against a violation of the treaties made at Hopewell, on the Keowee, on the 28th day of November, 1785, and on the 3d and 10th days of January, 1786, between the United States and the Cherokee, Choctaw, and Chickasaw nations of Indians ... I do by these presents require, all officers of the United States, as well civil as military, and all other citizens and inhabitants thereof, to govern themselves according to the treaties and act aforesaid, as they will answer the contrary at their peril.

— George Washington, Proclamation Regarding Treaties, Regarding Treaties with the Cherokee, Choctaw and Chickasaw, 1790.

==== Hopewell council and treaty (1786) ====
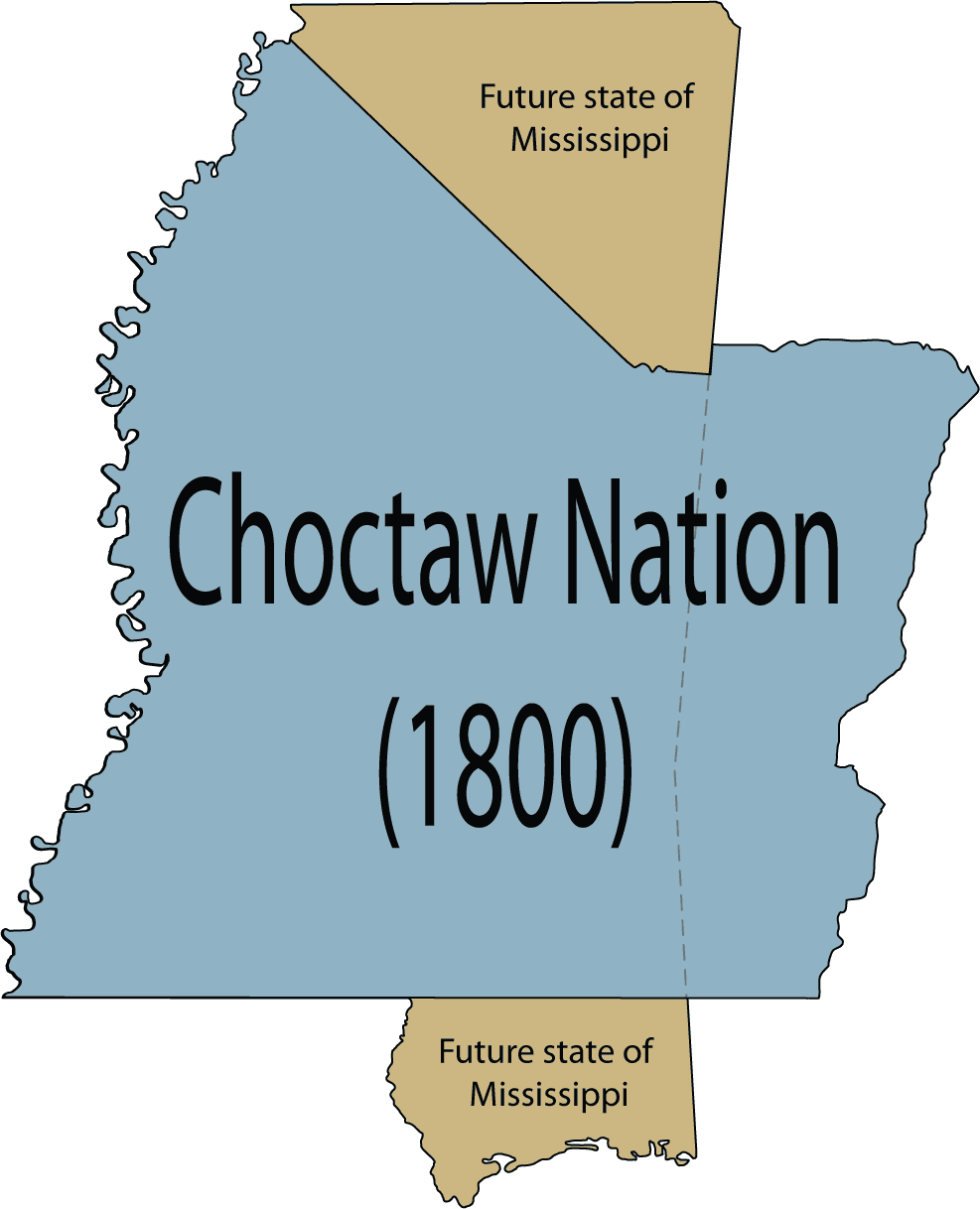
The complete Choctaw Nation shaded in blue in relation to the U.S. state of Mississippi.

Starting in October 1785, Taboca, a Choctaw prophet/chief, led over 125 Choctaws to the Keowee River, near Seneca Old Town. (It is now known as Hopewell, South Carolina.) After two months of travel, they met with U.S. representatives Benjamin Hawkins, Andrew Pickens, and Joseph Martin. In high Choctaw ceremonial symbolism, they named, adopted, smoked, and performed dances, revealing the complex and serious nature of Choctaw diplomacy. One such dance was the eagle tail dance. The Choctaw explained that the bald eagle, who has direct contact with the upper world of the sun, is a symbol of peace. Choctaw women painted in white would adopt and name the American commissioners as kin. Smoking sealed the agreements between peoples, and the shared pipes sanctified peace between the two nations.

After the rituals, the Choctaw asked John Woods to live with them to improve communication with the U.S. In exchange they allowed Taboca to visit the United States Congress. On January 3, 1786, the Treaty of Hopewell was signed. Article 11 stated, "[T]he hatchet shall be forever buried, and the peace given by the United States of America, and friendship re-established between the said states on the one part, and all the Choctaw nation on the other part, shall be universal; and the contracting parties shall use their utmost endeavors to maintain the peace given as aforesaid, and friendship re-established."

The treaty required the Choctaw to return escaped enslaved Africans to colonists, to turn over any Choctaw convicted of crimes by the U.S., establish borderlines between the U.S. and Choctaw Nation, and to return any property captured from colonists during the Revolutionary War.

In the early nineteenth century, President Thomas Jefferson considered a Choctaw proposal to settle debts with traders by selling land to the United States.

We have long heard of your nation as a numerous, peaceable, and friendly people; but this is the first visit we have had from its great men at the seat of our government. I welcome you here; am glad to take you by the hand, and to assure you, for your nation, that we are their friends. Born in the same land, we ought to live as brothers, doing to each other all the good we can, and not listening to wicked men, who may endeavor to make us enemies ... It is at the request which you sent me in September, signed by Puckshanublee and other chiefs, and which you now repeat, that I listen to your proposition to sell us lands. You say you owe a great debt to your merchants, that you have nothing to pay it with but lands, and you pray us to take lands, and pay your debt. The sum you have occasion for, brothers, is a very great one. We have never yet paid as much to any of our red brethren for the purchase of lands ...

— President Thomas Jefferson, Brothers of the Choctaw Nation, December 17, 1803

After the Revolutionary War, the Choctaw were reluctant to ally with countries hostile to the United States. John Swanton later wrote, "the Choctaw were never at war with the Americans. A few were induced by Tecumseh (a Shawnee leader who sought support from various Native American tribes) to ally themselves with the hostile Creeks [in the early 19th century], but the Nation as a whole was kept out of anti-American alliances by the influence of Apushmataha, greatest of all Choctaw chiefs."

==== War of 1812 ====
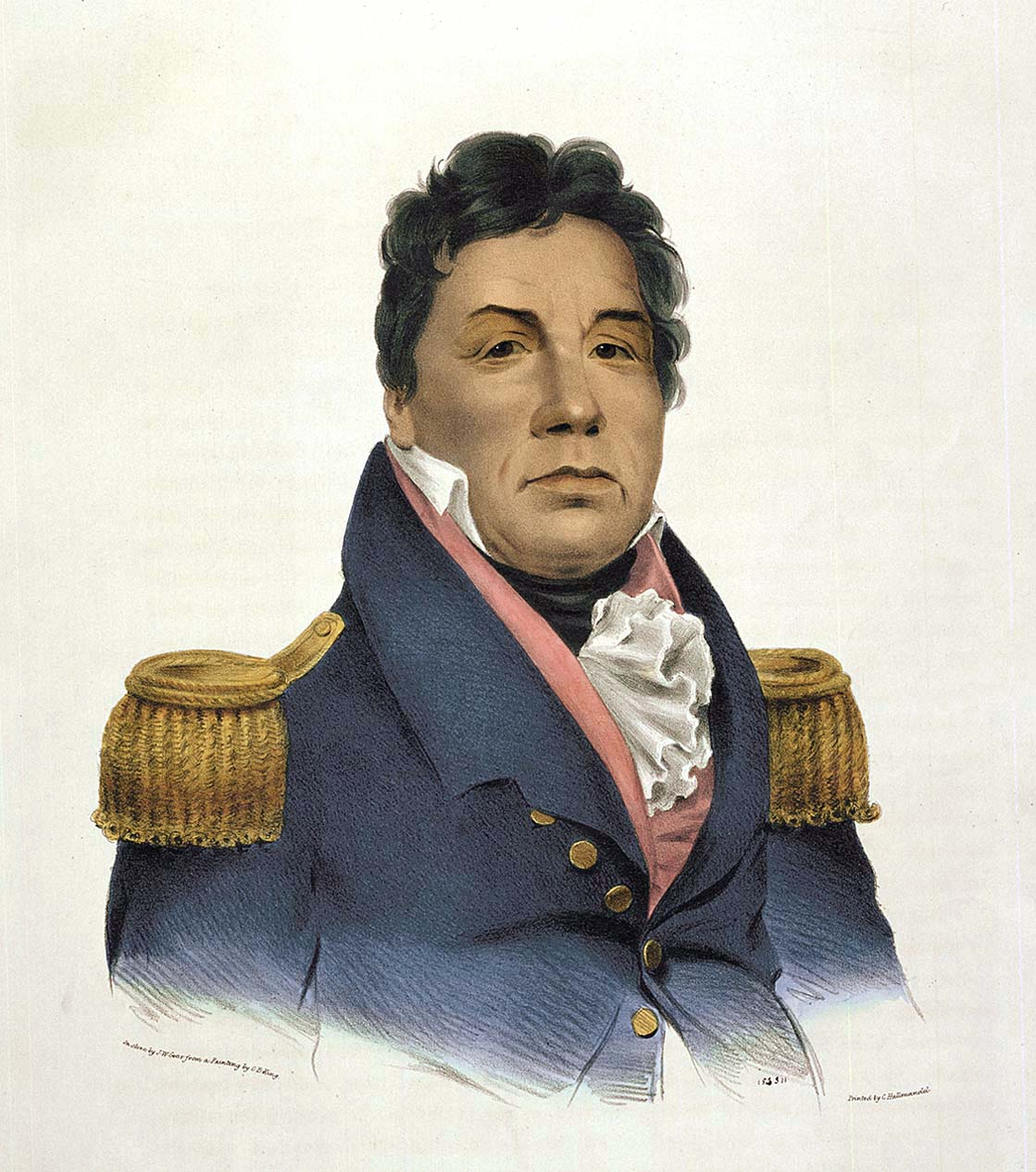
Pushmataha, (c. 1764-1824)

Early in 1811, the Shawnee leader Tecumseh gathered Indian tribes in an alliance to try to expel U.S. settlers from the Northwest area south of the Great Lakes and generally north of the Ohio River. Tecumseh met with Choctaw leaders to persuade them to join the alliance to expel European Americans from the Southeast. Pushmataha, considered by historians to be the greatest Choctaw leader, countered Tecumseh's influence. As chief for the Six Towns (southern) district, Pushmataha strongly resisted such a plan, arguing that the Choctaw and their neighboring Chickasaw had always lived in peace with European Americans, had learned valuable skills and technologies, and had received honest treatment and fair trade. The joint Choctaw-Chickasaw council voted against alliance with Tecumseh. On Tecumseh's departure, Pushmataha accused him of tyranny over his own Shawnee and other tribes. Pushmataha warned Tecumseh that he would fight against those who fought the United States.

On the eve of the War of 1812, Governor William C. C. Claiborne of Louisiana sent interpreter Simon Favre to talk to the Choctaws, urging them to stay out of this "white man's war." But the Choctaw did become involved, and Pushmataha led the Choctaw in alliance with the U.S. He argued against the Creek Red Sticks' (the traditional towns of that tribe) alliance with Britain after the massacre at Fort Mims. Pushmataha traveled to St. Stephens, Alabama, in mid-1813 to offer an alliance with US forces and to recruit Choctaw warriors. He was escorted further to Mobile to speak with General Flournoy, commander of the district. Flournoy initially declined Pushmataha's offer and offended the chief. But the general's staff quickly convinced him to reverse his decision. A courier caught up with Pushmataha at St. Stephens, with a message of Flournoy's acceptance.

In Choctaw territory, Pushmataha raised a company of 125 Choctaw warriors, and was commissioned by the Americans as either a lieutenant colonel or a brigadier general) in the United States Army at St. Stephens. After observing the Us officers and their wives promenading along the Alabama River, Pushmataha invited his own wife to St. Stephens to accompany him.

He joined the U.S. Army under General Ferdinand Claiborne in mid-November, and some 125 Choctaw warriors took part in an attack on Creek forces at Kantachi (near present day Econochaca, Alabama) on 23 December 1813. After this victory, Choctaw began to volunteer in greater numbers from their other two districts. By February 1814, Pushmataha commanded a larger Choctaw force, and joined General Andrew Jackson units to sweep Creek territories near Pensacola, Florida. After the final defeat of the Creek at the Battle of Horseshoe Bend in 1814, many Choctaw left. By the Battle of New Orleans, only a small group of Choctaw and Chickasaw warriors remained with Jackson's force. A Native American warrior of mixed ancestry named Pierre Juzan but also at times called Captain Pierre Jegeat led a force of the Choctaw warriors supporting Andrew Jackson in the Battle of New Orleans. Pierre Juzan and his Choctaw warriors under his command ambushed and harassed the British. The Choctaw warriors were described as lurking "way out in the swamp, basking on logs, like so many alligators." The Choctaws "came unexpectedly out of the swamp on the British right rear and delivered a most destructive fire at short rifle-range without themselves breaking cover at all." Juzan and the Choctaws simply terrorized the British. The Choctaw "patrolled the edge of the swamp, leaping unperceived from one log to another...and shot every redcoat who came within rifle range. Not less than fifty British soldiers were killed and many more severely wounded by this method of assassination." One of the notable Choctaw warriors who was of mixed blood named Poindexter killed 5 British sentries over the space of three nights while lurking in the swamps.

==== Doak's Stand (1820) ====
In October 1820, Andrew Jackson and Thomas Hinds were sent as commissioners representing the United States, to conduct a treaty that would require the Choctaw to surrender to the United States a portion of their country located in present day Mississippi. They met with chiefs, mingos (leaders), and headsmen such as Colonel Silas Dinsmore and Chief Pushmataha at Doak's Stand on the Natchez Trace.

Finally Jackson resorted to threats and a temper tantrum to gain their consent. He warned them of the loss of American friendship; he promised to wage war against them and destroy the Nation; finally he shouted his determination to remove them whether they liked it or not.

— Robert V. Remini, Andrew Jackson

The convention began on October 10 with a talk by "Sharp Knife", the nickname of Jackson, to more than 500 Choctaws. Pushmataha accused Jackson of deceiving them about the quality of land west of the Mississippi. Pushmataha responded to Jackson's retort with "I know the country well ... The grass is everywhere very short ... There are but few beavers, and the honey and fruit are rare things." Jackson resorted to threats, which pressured the Choctaws to sign the Doak's Stand treaty. Pushmataha would continue to argue with Jackson about the conditions of the treaty. Pushmataha assertively stated "that no alteration shall be made in the boundaries of the portion of our territory that will remain, until the Choctaw people are sufficiently progressed in the arts of civilization to become citizens of the States, owning land and homes of their own, on an equal footing with the white people." Jackson responded with "That ... is a magnificent rangement and we consent to it, [American Citizenship], readily." Historian Anna Lewis stated that Apuckshunubbee, a Choctaw district chief, was blackmailed by Jackson to sign the treaty. On October 18, the Treaty of Doak's Stand was signed.

Article 4 of the Treaty of Doak's Stand prepared Choctaws to become U.S. citizens by becoming "civilized." This article would later influence Article 14 in the Treaty of Dancing Rabbit Creek.

ARTICLE 4. The boundaries hereby established between the Choctaw Indians and the United States, on this side of the Mississippi river, shall remain without alteration until the period at which said nation shall become so civilized and enlightened as to be made citizens of the United States ...

— Treaty with the Choctaw, 1820

==== Negotiations with the US government (1820s) ====
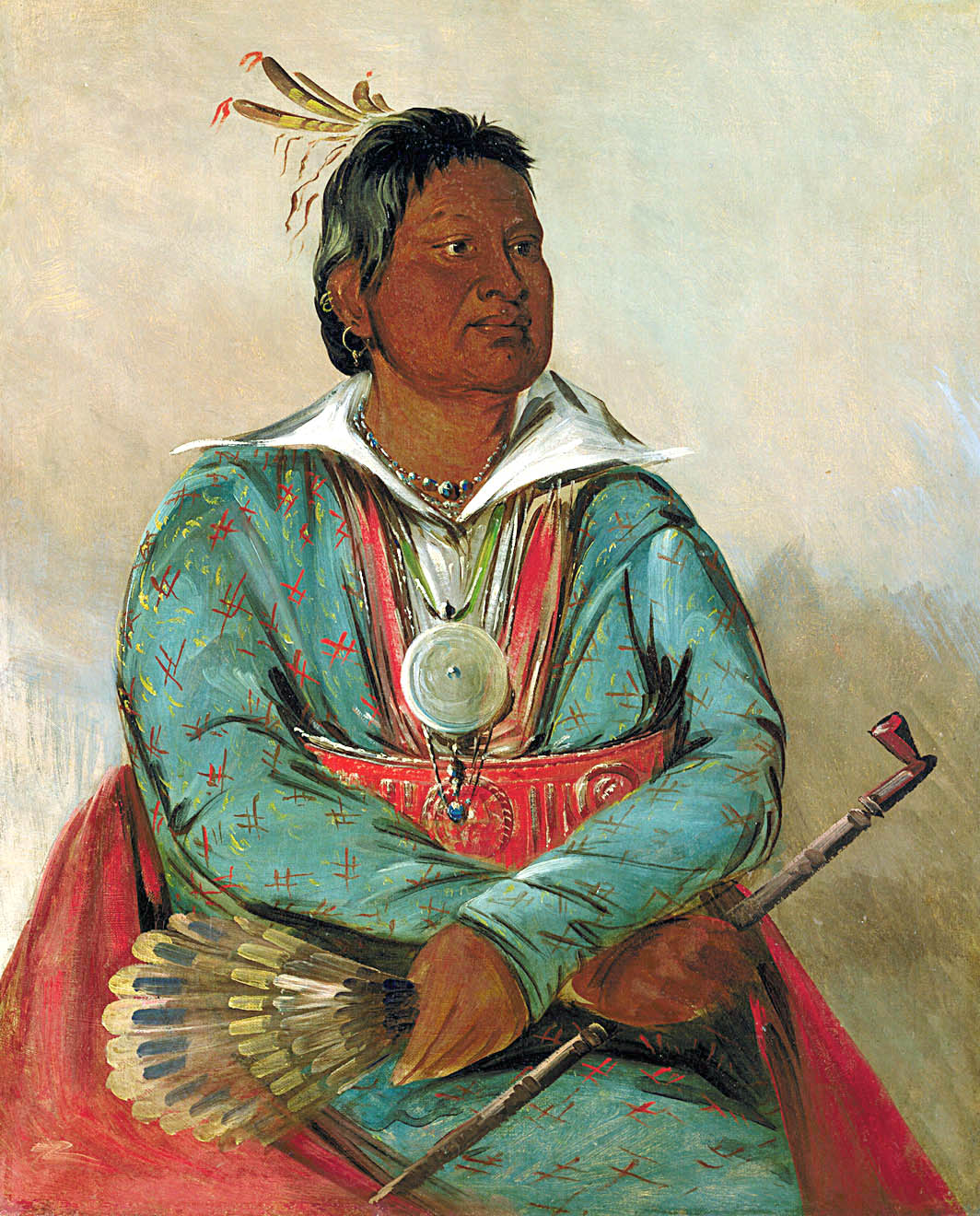
In 1830 Mosholatubbee sought to be elected to the Congress of the United States. 1834, Smithsonian American Art Museum

Apuckshunubbee, Pushmataha, and Mosholatubbee, the principal chiefs of the three divisions of Choctaw, led a delegation to Washington City (the 19th-century name for Washington, D.C.) to discuss the problems of European Americans' squatting on Choctaw lands. They sought either expulsion of the settlers or financial compensation for the loss of use of their lands. The group included Talking Warrior, Red Fort; Nittahkachee, who was later Principal Chief; Col. Robert Cole, and David Folsom, both Choctaw of mixed-race ancestry; Captain Daniel McCurtain, and Major John Pitchlynn, the U.S. interpreter, who had been raised by the Choctaw and married a Choctaw woman, after having been orphaned when young. Apuckshunubbee died in Maysville, Kentucky, of an accident before the party reached Washington.

Pushmataha met with President James Monroe and gave a speech to Secretary of War John C. Calhoun, reminding him of the longstanding alliances between the United States and the Choctaw. He said, "[I] can say and tell the truth that no Choctaw ever drew his bow against the United States ... My nation has given of their country until it is very small. We are in trouble." On January 20, 1825, Choctaw chiefs signed the Treaty of Washington City, by which the Choctaw ceded more territory to the United States.

Pushmataha died in Washington of a respiratory disease described as croup, before the delegation returned to the Choctaw Nation. He was given full U.S. military burial honors at the Congressional Cemetery in Washington, D.C.

The deaths of these two strong division leaders was a major loss to the Choctaw Nation, but younger leaders were rising, some educated in European-American schools, who led adaptation of the culture. Threatened with European-American encroachment, the Choctaw continued to adapt: they took on some technology and housing styles, and accepted missionaries to their people. They hoped to gain acceptance by the Mississippi and national governments, to end encroachment of their lands. In 1825 the National Council approved founding the Choctaw Academy, to educate their young men, as urged by Peter Pitchlynn, a young leader and future chief. The school was established in Blue Spring, Scott County, Kentucky. It operated there until 1842, when the staff and students moved to the Choctaw Nation, Indian Territory after removal of most of the tribe. There they founded the Spencer Academy in 1844.

With the election of Andrew Jackson as president in 1828, many of the Choctaw realized that removal was inevitable. They continued to adopt useful European practices but faced Jackson's and settlers' unrelenting pressure to give up their lands.

=== 1830 election and treaty ===
In March 1830 the division chiefs resigned, and the National Council elected Greenwood LeFlore, chief of the western division, as Principal Chief of the nation to negotiate with the US government on their behalf, the first time such a position had been authorized. Believing removal was inevitable and hoping to preserve rights for Choctaw in Indian Territory and Mississippi, LeFlore drafted a treaty and sent it to Washington, D.C. There was considerable turmoil in the Choctaw Nation among people who thought he would and could resist removal, but the chiefs had agreed they could not undertake armed resistance.

=== Treaty of Dancing Rabbit Creek (1830) ===
At Andrew Jackson's request, the United States Congress opened what became a fierce debate on an Indian Removal Bill. In the end, the bill passed, but the vote was very close. The Senate passed the measure 28 to 19, while in the House it narrowly passed, 102 to 97. Jackson signed the legislation into law June 30, 1830, and turned his focus onto the Choctaw in Mississippi Territory.

To the voters of Mississippi. Fellow Citizens:-I have fought for you, I have been by your own act, made a citizen of your state; ... According to your laws I am an American citizen, ... I have always battled on the side of this republic ... I have been told by my white brethren, that the pen of history is impartial, and that in after years, our forlorn kindred will have justice and "mercy too" ... I wish you would elect me a member to the next Congress of the [United] States.

— Mushulatubba, Christian Mirror and N.H. Observer, July 1830.

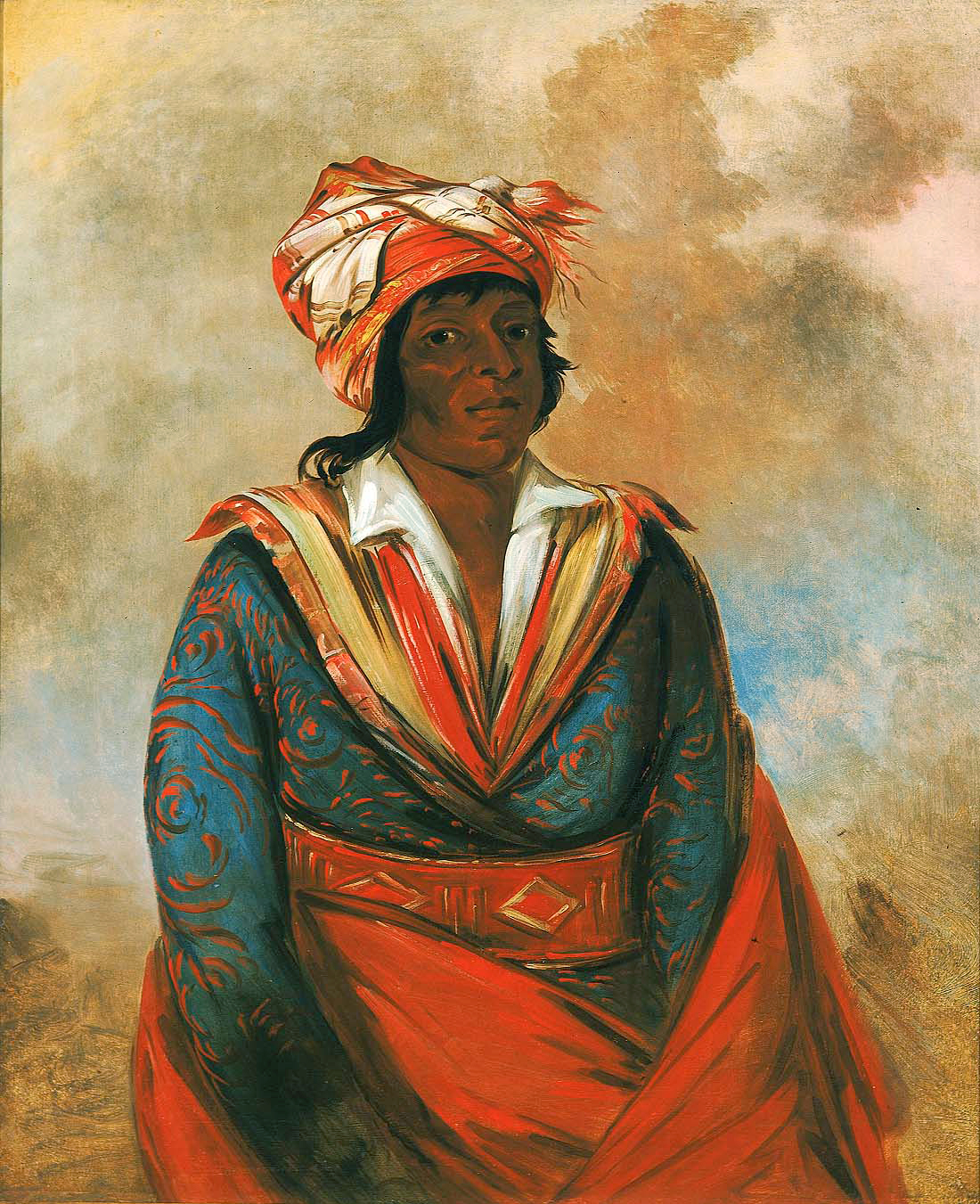
Kutteeotubbee was a noted warrior. 1834, Smithsonian American Art Museum

On August 25, 1830, the Choctaw were supposed to meet with Andrew Jackson in Franklin, Tennessee, but Greenwood Leflore, a district Choctaw chief, informed Secretary of War John H. Eaton that his warriors were fiercely opposed to attending. President Jackson was angered. Journalist Len Green writes "although angered by the Choctaw refusal to meet him in Tennessee, Jackson felt from LeFlore's words that he might have a foot in the door and dispatched Secretary of War Eaton and John Coffee to meet with the Choctaws in their nation." Jackson appointed Eaton and General John Coffee as commissioners to represent him to meet the Choctaws at the Dancing Rabbit Creek near present-day Noxubee, Mississippi Territory. although the actual site of the Treaty was never specifically mentioned.

Say to them as friends and brothers to listen [to] the voice of their father, & friend. Where [they] now are, they and my white children are too near each other to live in harmony & peace ... It is their white brothers and my wishes for them to remove beyond the Mississippi, it [contains] the [best] advice to both the Choctaws and Chickasaws, whose happiness ... will certainly be promoted by removing ... There ... their children can live upon [it as] long as grass grows or water runs ... It shall be theirs forever ... and all who wish to remain as citizens [shall have] reservations laid out to cover [their improv]ements; and the justice due [from a] father to his red children will [be awarded to] them. [Again I] beg you, tell them to listen. [The plan proposed] is the only one by which [they can be] perpetuated as a nation ... I am very respectfully your friend, & the friend of my Choctaw and Chickasaw brethren. Andrew Jackson.

— Andrew Jackson to the Choctaw & Chickasaw Nations, 1829.

The commissioners met with the chiefs and headmen on September 15, 1830, at Dancing Rabbit Creek. In a carnival-like atmosphere, they tried to explain the policy of removal to an audience of 6,000 men, women, and children. The Choctaws faced migration or submitting to U.S. law as citizens. The treaty required them to cede their remaining traditional homeland to the United States; however, a provision in the treaty made removal more acceptable.

ART. XIV. Each Choctaw head of a family being desirous to remain and become a citizen of the States, shall be permitted to do so, by signifying his intention to the Agent within six months from the ratification of this Treaty, and he or she shall thereupon be entitled to a reservation of one section of six hundred and forty acres of land ...

— Treaty of Dancing Rabbit Creek, 1830

On September 27, 1830, the Treaty of Dancing Rabbit Creek was signed. It represented one of the largest transfers of land that was signed between the U.S. Government and Native Americans without being instigated by warfare. By the treaty, the Choctaw signed away their remaining traditional homelands, opening them up for European-American settlement. Article 14 allowed for some Choctaw to stay in Mississippi, and nearly 1,300 Choctaws chose to do so. They were one of the first major non-European ethnic group to become U.S. citizens. Article 22 sought to put a Choctaw representative in the U.S. House of Representatives. The Choctaw at this crucial time split into two distinct groups: the Choctaw Nation of Oklahoma and the Mississippi Band of Choctaw Indians. The nation retained its autonomy, but the tribe in Mississippi submitted to state and federal laws.

=== Removal era ===
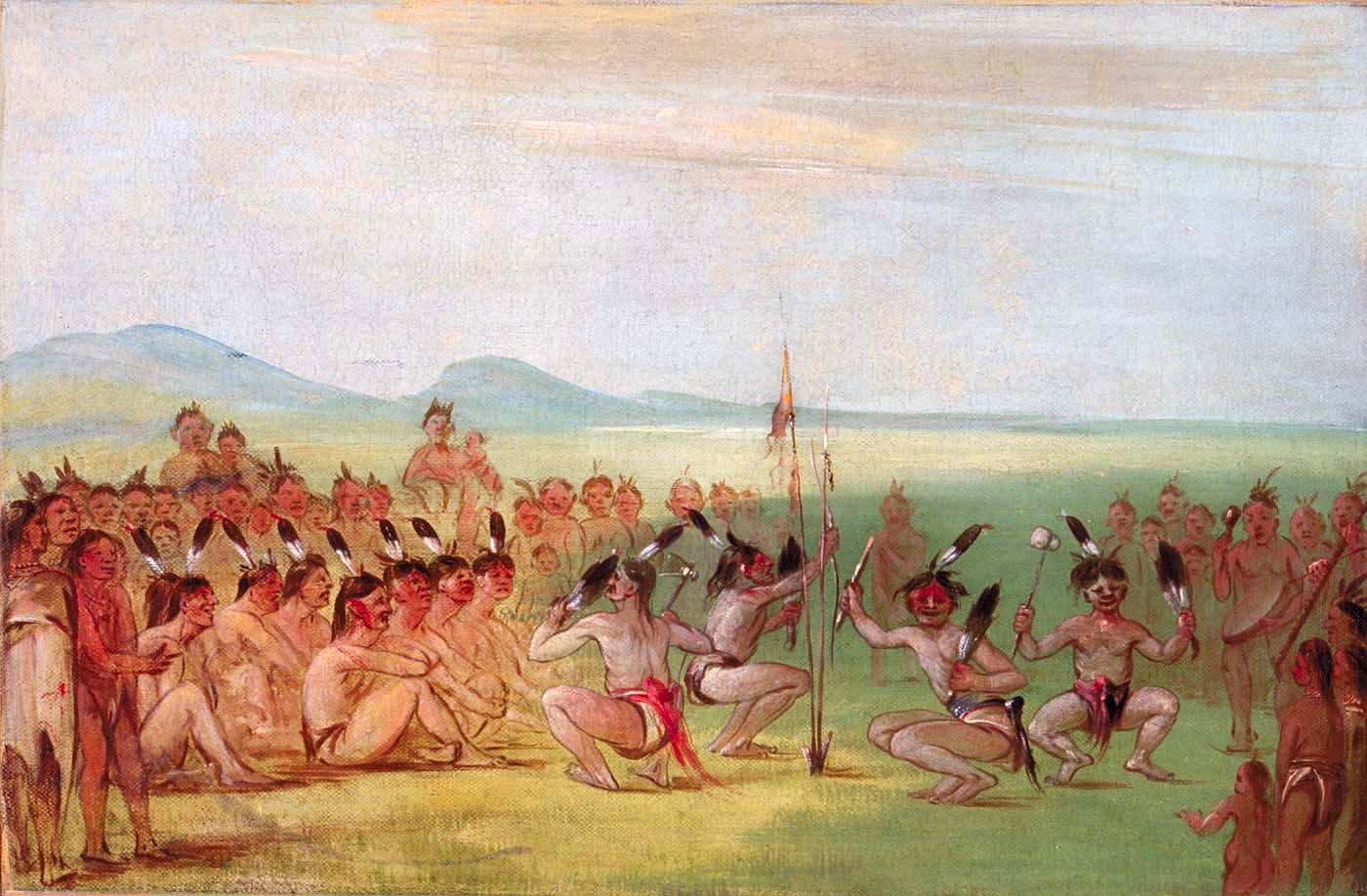
Choctaw Eagle Dance, 1835–37, by George Catlin; Smithsonian American Art Museum

After ceding nearly 11,000,000 acres (45,000 km^{2}), the Choctaw emigrated in three stages: the first in the fall of 1831, the second in 1832 and the last in 1833. Nearly 15,000 Choctaws made the move to what would be called Indian Territory and then later Oklahoma. About 2,500 died along the Trail of Tears. The Treaty of Dancing Rabbit Creek was ratified by the U.S. Senate on February 25, 1831, and the President was anxious to make it a model of removal. Principal Chief George W. Harkins wrote a farewell letter to the American people before the removals began. It was widely published

It is with considerable diffidence that I attempt to address the American people, knowing and feeling sensibly my incompetency; and believing that your highly and well improved minds would not be well entertained by the address of a Choctaw ... We as Choctaws rather chose to suffer and be free ...

— George W. Harkins, George W. Harkins to the American People

Alexis de Tocqueville, noted French political thinker and historian, witnessed the Choctaw removals while in Memphis, Tennessee, in 1831:

In the whole scene there was an air of ruin and destruction, something which betrayed a final and irrevocable adieu; one couldn't watch without feeling one's heart wrung. The Indians were tranquil, but sombre and taciturn. There was one who could speak English and of whom I asked why the Chactas were leaving their country. "To be free," he answered, could never get any other reason out of him. We ... watch the expulsion ... of one of the most celebrated and ancient American peoples.

— Alexis de Tocqueville, Democracy in America

Approximately 4,000–6,000 Choctaw remained in Mississippi in 1831 after the initial removal efforts. The U.S. agent William Ward, who was responsible for Choctaw registration in Mississippi under article XIV, strongly opposed their treaty rights. Although estimates suggested 5000 Choctaw remained in Mississippi, only 143 family heads (for a total of 276 adult persons) received lands under the provisions of Article 14. For the next ten years, the Choctaws in Mississippi were objects of increasing legal conflict, racism, harassment, and intimidation. The Choctaws described their situation in 1849: "we have had our habitations torn down and burned, our fences destroyed, cattle turned into our fields and we ourselves have been scourged, manacled, fettered and otherwise personally abused, until by such treatment some of our best men have died." Joseph B. Cobb, who moved to Mississippi from Georgia, described the Choctaw as having "no nobility or virtue at all, and in some respect he found blacks, especially native Africans, more interesting and admirable, the red man's superior in every way. The Choctaw and Chickasaw, the tribes he knew best, were beneath contempt, that is, even worse than black slaves." Removal continued throughout the 19th and 20th centuries. In 1846 1,000 Choctaw removed, and in 1903, another 300 Mississippi Choctaw were persuaded to move to the Nation in Oklahoma. By 1930 only 1,665 remained in Mississippi.

I do certify that the foregoing persons did apply to me as agent to have their names registered to remain five years and become citizens of the States before the 24th (August) 1831.

— William Ward, 1831, Col. William Wards Register

==== Pre-Civil War (1840) ====
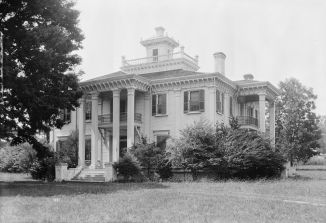
Choctaw chief Greenwood LeFlore's plantation home, Malmaison, was built in 1852 near Greenwood, Mississippi, and was described as a "palace in the wilderness."

Choctaw chief Greenwood LeFlore stayed in Mississippi after the signing of Treaty of Dancing Rabbit Creek and removal of most of the tribe. He became a US citizen, successful businessman, and state politician. He was elected as a Mississippi state representative and later as a senator, was a fixture of Mississippi high society, and became a friend of Jefferson Davis. He represented his county in the state house for two terms and served as a state senator for one term. Some of the elite used the Latin language, an indulgence used by some politicians. LeFlore spoke in Choctaw and asked the Senate floor which was better understood in the region, Latin or Choctaw.

Midway through the Great Irish Famine (1845–1849), the Choctaw agency at Fort Smith, Arkansas, raised funds totaling $170 and sent it to help starving Irish men, women, and children. The Arkansas Intelligencer reported that "all subscribed, agents, missionaries, traders and Indians, a considerable portion of which fund was made up by the latter."

It had been just 16 years since the Choctaw people had experienced the Trail of Tears, and they had faced starvation ... It was an amazing gesture. By today's standards, it might be a million dollars", according to Judy Allen, editor of the Choctaw Nation of Oklahoma's newspaper, Bishinik, based at the Oklahoma Choctaw tribal headquarters in Durant, Oklahoma.

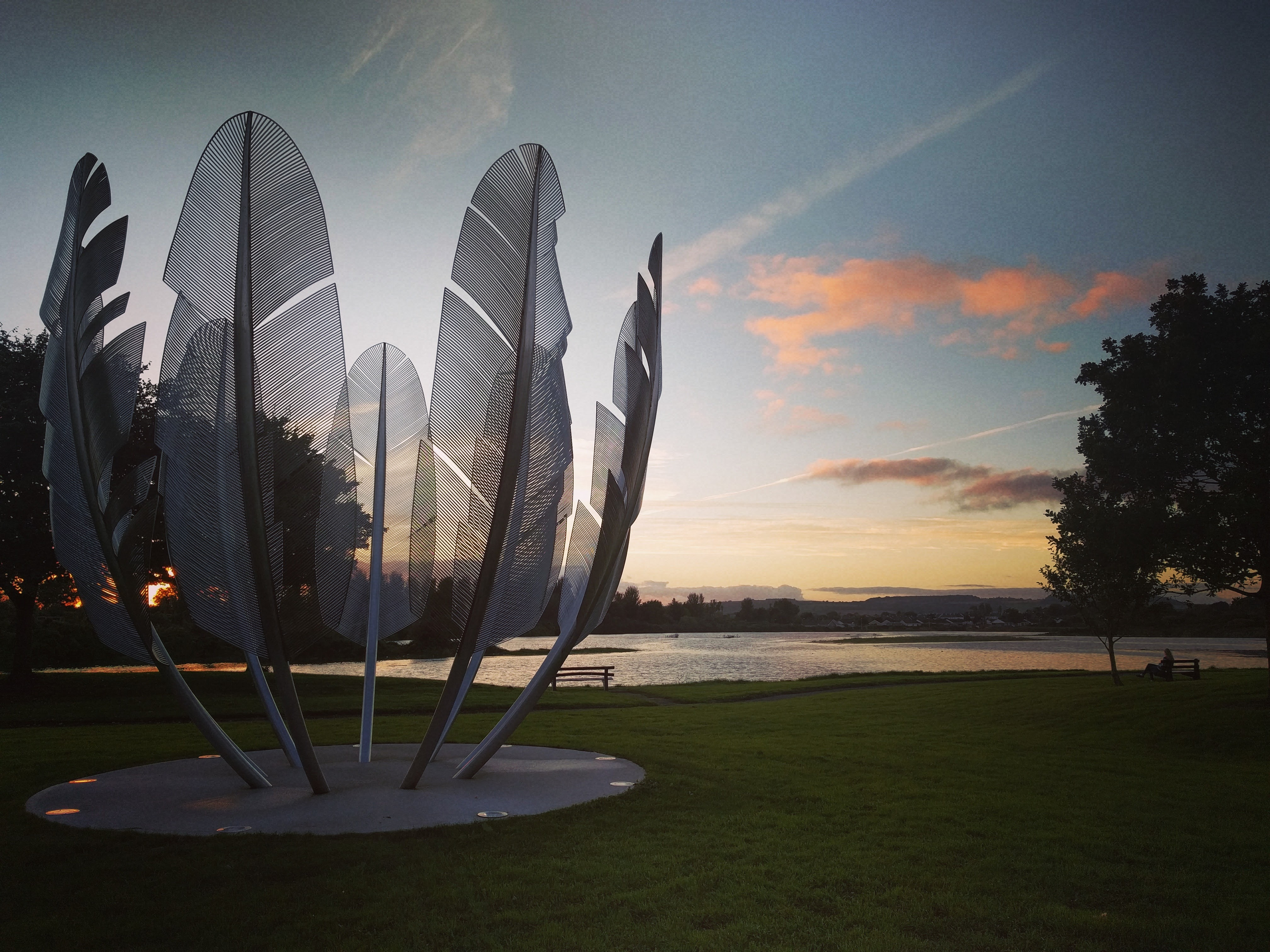
Kindred Spirits sculpture in Midleton, County Cork, Ireland.

To mark the 150th anniversary, eight Irish people retraced the Trail of Tears. In the late 20th century, Irish President Mary Robinson extolled the donation in a public commemoration. On 18 June 2017 the Kindred Spirits memorial by the sculptor Alex Pentek, a circle of six-metre-tall steel feathers making a bowl and representing both the Choctaw tradition and a symbolic bowl of food, was unveiled in Midleton, County Cork. A Choctaw delegation, which included Chief Gary Batton, Chief of the Choctaw Nation, and Assistant Chief Jack Austin Jr., attended the memorial's dedication ceremony that involved presentations of both Choctaw and Irish culture. On 12 March 2018 the Irish Taoiseach Leo Varadkar announced a new scholarship program to allow Choctaw students to travel to and study in Ireland. In the spring of 2020, during the COVID-19 pandemic, an Irish charity drive raised more than $1.8 million to support the struggling Navajo and Hopi Nations as repayment for the Choctaws' donation more than a century before.

For the Choctaw who remained in or returned to Mississippi after 1855, the situation deteriorated. Many lost their lands and money to unscrupulous whites. The state of Mississippi refused the Choctaw any participation in government. Most were isolated by their limited understanding of the English language, which made it difficult for them to work in mainstream society. In addition, the European Americans had classified them as free people of color and excluded them from segregated white educational institutions. The state had no public schools before those established during the Reconstruction era.

Choctaws ... were at the mercy of the whites who could commit crimes against them without fear of the law. Even black slaves had more legal rights than did the Choctaws during this period.

— Charles Hudson- The Southeastern Indians

==== 1853 World's Fair ====
In May 1853, Choctaws sailed out of Mobile, Alabama for Boston and New York. They were to participate in America's "first" world's fair: Exhibition of the Industry of All Nations.

CHOCTAW INDIANS FOR THE CRYSTAL PALACE.—Capt. Post, of the schooner J. S. Lane, who arrived on Sunday, from Mobile, states that on the 26th ultimo, off the Great Isaacs, he spoke the brig Pembroke, from, Mobile for New-York, having on board a company of Choctaw Indians, for exhibition at the Crystal Palace.

— New-York Daily Times, June 8, 1853

THE CHOCTAW INDIANS.—Each succeeding performance of these interesting aborigines prove. that they are increasing in popularity with our citizens. Their delineations of the "Great Ball Play," drew down the plaudits of the house. They appear this evening and to-morrow, after which they quit Brooklyn, wending their way homewards. The Brooklyn Museum is not half large enough to contain the crowds that flock nightly to its doors. There will be afternoon performances this day and to-morrow, to accommodate the young folks.

— The Brooklyn Daily Eagle, July 29, 1853

CHOCTAW INDIANS.—These wonderful and thrilling Exhibitions are attracting intense interest. The crowds that see them, go away astonished and delighted with valuable information. Among the Company are Hoocha, their chief, aged 58 years; Teschu the Medicine man, aged 58; and Silver smith. This is the greatest opportunity ever given to the New-Yorkers to obtain a full idea of Indian life. The GREAT BALL PLAY, and the grand exciting WAR DANCE, will be exhibited this Evening, with other Dances and Songs of great interest. At the Assembly Rooms, Broadway, above Howard-st. Doors open at 7. Exercises to commence at 8. Admission 25 cents. Reserved Seats 50 cents.

— New-York Daily Times, August 19, 1853

==== American Civil War (1861) ====
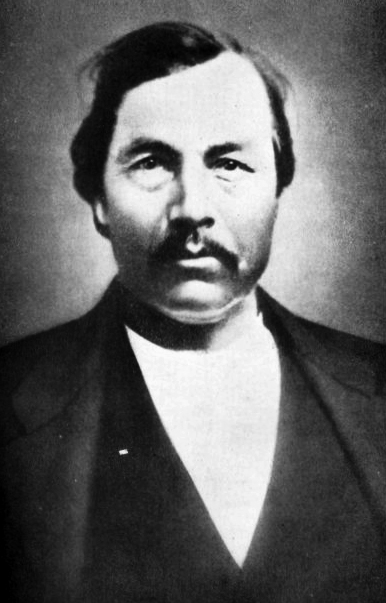
Jackson McCurtain, Lieutenant Colonel of the First Choctaw Battalion, CSA, late principal chief

Both Indian Territory and Mississippi Choctaws in the American Civil War allied with the Confederate States of America. They signed the Treaty with Choctaws and Chickasaws in July 1861, which promised Choctaw and Chickasaw national sovereignty. Historian Horatio B. Cushman, wrote that the, "United States abandoned the Choctaws and Chickasaws" when Confederate troops had entered into their nation. Upon defeat, the Choctaw Nation in Indian Territory signed a 1866 Reconstruction Treaty that ceded the western portion of their lands to the United States.

=== Under Reconstruction (1865) ===
==== Mississippi Choctaw ====
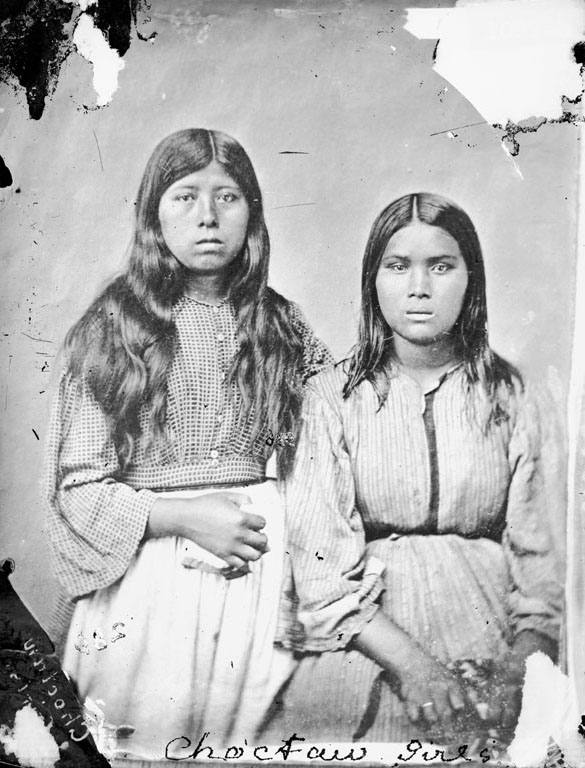
Choctaw girls in 1868. Smithsonian Institution.

From about 1865 to 1914, Mississippi Choctaws were largely ignored by governmental, health, and educational services and fell into obscurity. In the aftermath of the Civil War, their issues were pushed aside in the struggle between defeated Confederates, freedmen and Union sympathizers. Records about the Mississippi Choctaw during this period are few. They had no legal recourse, and were often bullied and intimidated by local whites, who tried to re-establish white supremacy. They chose to live in isolation and practiced their culture as they had for generations.

Following the Reconstruction era and conservative Democrats' regaining political power in the late 1870s, white state legislators passed laws establishing Jim Crow laws and legal segregation by race. In addition, they effectively disfranchised freedmen and Native Americans by the new Mississippi constitution of 1890, which changed rules regarding voter registration and elections to discriminate against both groups. The white legislators effectively divided society into two groups: white and "colored," into which they classified Mississippi Choctaw and other Native Americans. They subjected the Choctaw to racial segregation and exclusion from public facilities along with freedmen and their descendants. The Choctaw were non-white, landless, and had minimal legal protection.

Because the state remained dependent on agriculture, despite the declining price of cotton, most landless men earned a living by becoming sharecroppers. The women created and sold traditional hand-woven baskets. Choctaw sharecropping declined following World War II as major planters had adopted mechanization, which reduced the need for labor.

==== Choctaw Nation ====
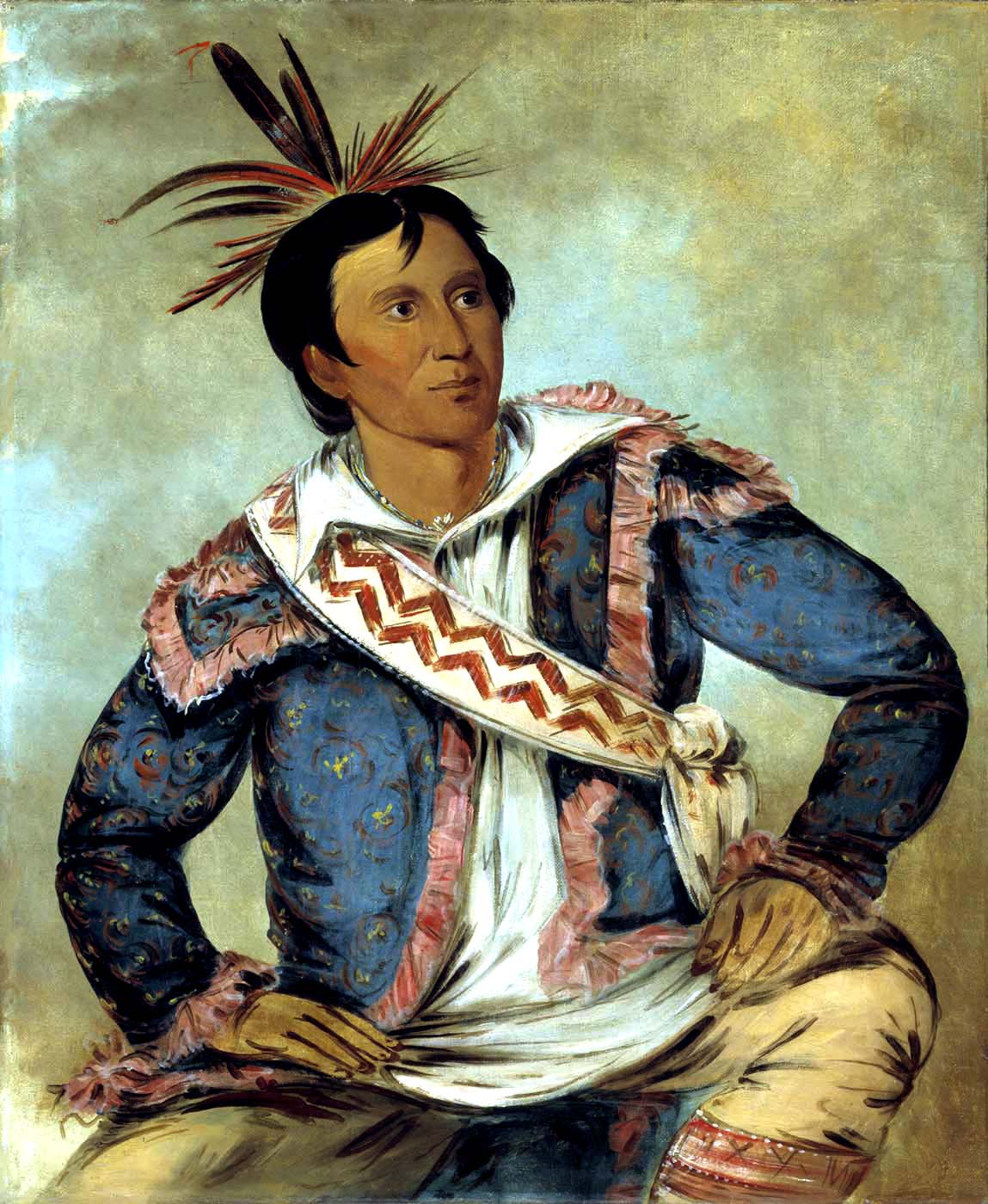
Peter Pitchlynn was the Choctaw Principal Chief from 1864 to 1866, and a Choctaw Delegate to Washington, D.C., for nearly two decades following. He is buried in the Congressional Cemetery in Washington, D.C. Painting, 1834, Smithsonian American Art Museum

The Confederacy's loss was also the Choctaw Nation's loss. Prior to removal, the Choctaws had interacted with Africans in their native homeland of Mississippi, and the wealthiest had bought slaves. The Choctaw who developed larger plantations adopted chattel slavery, as practiced by European Americans, to gain sufficient labor. During the antebellum period, enslaved Black people had more formal legal protection under United States law than did the Choctaw. Moshulatubbee, the chief of the western region, held slaves, as did many of the Europeans who married into the Choctaw nation. The Choctaw took slaves with them to Indian Territory during removal, and descendants purchased others there. They kept slavery until 1866. After the Civil War, they were required by treaty with the United States to emancipate the slaves within their Nation and, for those who chose to stay, offer them full citizenship and rights. Former slaves of the Choctaw Nation were called the Choctaw Freedmen. After considerable debate, the Choctaw Nation granted Choctaw Freedmen citizenship in 1885. In post-war treaties, the US government also acquired land in the western part of the territory and access rights for railroads to be built across Indian Territory. Choctaw chief, Allen Wright, suggested Oklahoma (red man, a portmanteau of the Choctaw words okla "man" and humma "red") as the name of a territory created from Indian Territory in 1890.

The improved transportation afforded by the railroads increased the pressure on the Choctaw Nation. It drew large-scale mining and timber operations, which added to tribal receipts. But, the railroads and industries also attracted European-American settlers, including new immigrants to the United States.

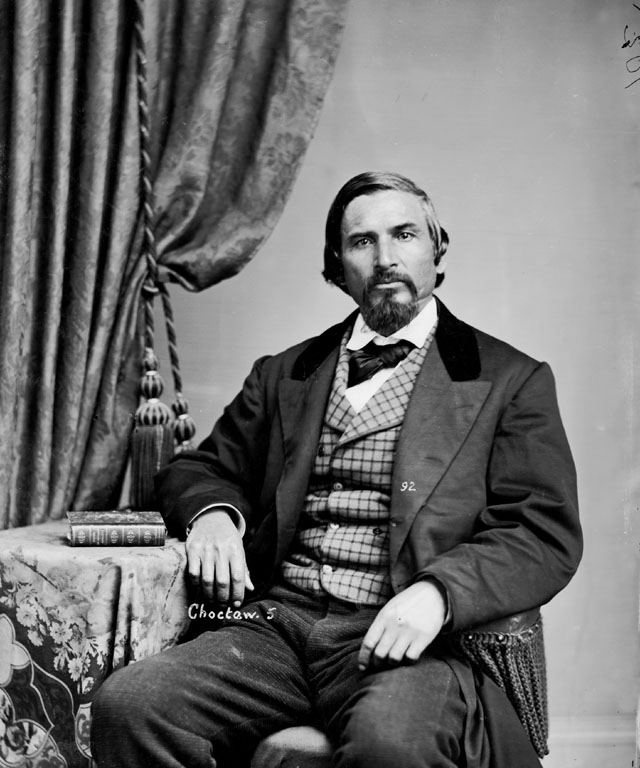
Faunceway Baptiste, a Choctaw man of mixed-race ancestry. 1868, Smithsonian Institution.

With the goal of assimilating the Native Americans, the Curtis Act of 1898, sponsored by a Native American who believed that was the way for his people to do better, ended tribal governments. In addition, it proposed the end of communal, tribal lands. Continuing the struggle over land and assimilation, the US proposed the end to the tribal lands held in common, and allotment of lands to tribal members in severalty (individually). The US declared land in excess of the registered households needs to be "surplus" to the tribe, and took it for sale to new European-American settlers. In addition, individual ownership meant that Native Americans could sell their individual plots. This would also enable new settlers to buy land from those Native Americans who wished to sell. The US government set up the Dawes Commission to manage the land allotment policy; it registered members of the tribe and made allocations of lands.

Beginning in 1894, the Dawes Commission was established to register Choctaw and other families of the Indian Territory, so that the former tribal lands could be properly distributed among them. The final list included 18,981 citizens of the Choctaw Nation, 1,639 Mississippi Choctaw, and 5,994 former slaves (and descendants of former slaves), most held by Choctaws in the Indian/Oklahoma Territory. (At the same time, the Dawes Commission registered members of the other Five Civilized Tribes for the same purpose. The Dawes Rolls have become important records for proving tribal membership.) Following completion of the land allotments, the US proposed to end tribal governments of the Five Civilized Tribes and admit the two territories jointly as a state.

==== Territory transition to Oklahoma statehood (1889) ====
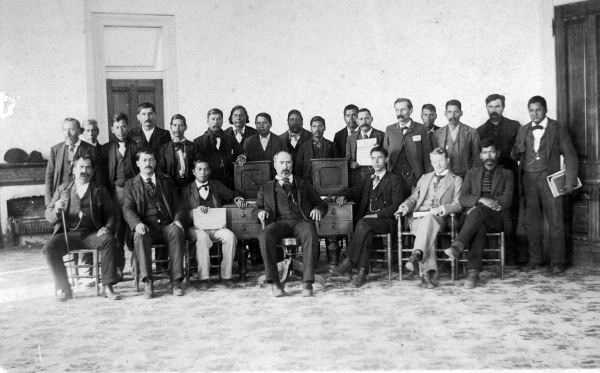
Choctaw Nation senate in 1898. Oklahoma Historical Society.

The establishment of Oklahoma Territory following the Civil War was a required land cession by the Five Civilized Tribes, who had supported the Confederacy. The government used its railroad access to the Oklahoma Territory to stimulate development there. The Indian Appropriations Bill of 1889 included an amendment by Illinois Representative William McKendree Springer, that authorized President Benjamin Harrison to open the two million acres (8,000 km^{2}) of Oklahoma Territory for settlement, resulting in the Land Run of 1889. The Choctaw Nation was overwhelmed with new settlers and could not regulate their activities. In the late 19th century, Choctaws suffered almost daily from violent crimes, murders, thefts and assaults from whites and from other Choctaws. Intense factionalism divided the traditionalistic "Nationalists" and pro-assimilation "Progressives," who fought for control.

In 1905, delegates of the Five Civilized Tribes met at the Sequoyah Convention to write a constitution for an Indian-controlled state. They wanted to have Indian Territory admitted as the State of Sequoyah. Although they took a thoroughly developed proposal to Washington, D.C., seeking approval, eastern states' representatives opposed it, not wanting to have two western states created in the area, as the Republicans feared that both would be Democrat-dominated, as the territories had a southern tradition of settlement. President Theodore Roosevelt, a Republican, ruled that the Oklahoma and Indian territories had to be jointly admitted as one state, Oklahoma. To achieve this, tribal governments had to end and all residents accept state government. Many of the leading Native American representatives from the Sequoyah Convention participated in the new state convention. Its constitution was based on many elements of the one developed for the State of Sequoyah.

In 1906 the U.S. dissolved the governments of the Five Civilized Tribes. This action was part of continuing negotiations by Native Americans and European Americans over the best proposals for the future. The Choctaw Nation continued to protect resources not stipulated in treaty or law. On November 16, 1907, Oklahoma was admitted to the union as the 46th state.

=== Mississippi Choctaw Delegation to Washington (1914) ===
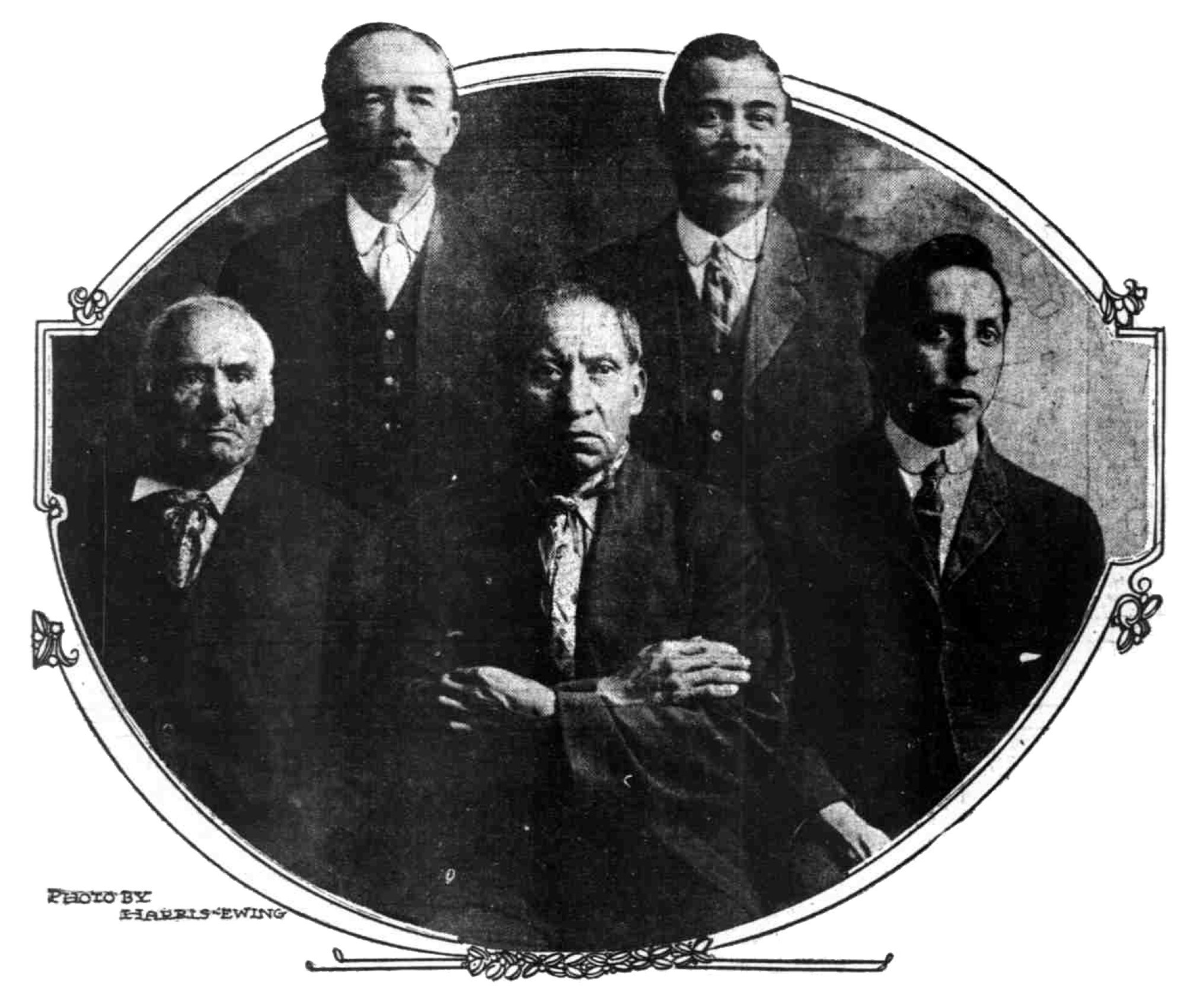
From left to right, Chief Wesley Johnson, T. B. Sullivan, Culberson Davis, James E. Arnold, and Emil John.

By 1907, the Mississippi Choctaw were in danger of becoming extinct. The Dawes Commission had sent a large number of the Mississippi Choctaws to Indian Territory, and only 1,253 members remained. Meetings were held in April and May 1913 to try to find a solution to this problem. Wesley Johnson was elected chief of the newly formed Mississippi, Alabama, and Louisiana Choctaw Council at the May 1913 meeting. After some deliberation, the council selected delegates to send to Washington, D.C. to bring attention to their plight. Historian Robert Bruce Ferguson wrote in his 2015 article that:

In late January 1914, Chief Wesley Johnson and his delegates (Culbertson Davis and Emil John) traveled to Washington, D. C. ... While they were in Washington, Johnson, Davis, and John met with numerous senators & representatives and persuaded the federals to bring the Choctaw case before Congress. On February 5th, their mission culminated with the meeting of President Woodrow Wilson. Culbertson Davis presented a beaded Choctaw belt as a token of goodwill to the President.

Nearly two years after the trip to Washington, the Indian Appropriations Act of May 18, 1916, was passed. A stipulation allowed $1,000 for an investigation on the Mississippi Choctaws' condition. John R. T. Reeves was to "investigate the condition of the Indians living in Mississippi and report to Congress ... as to their needs for additional land and school facilities ..." Reeves submitted his report on November 6, 1916.

==== Hearing at Union, Mississippi ====
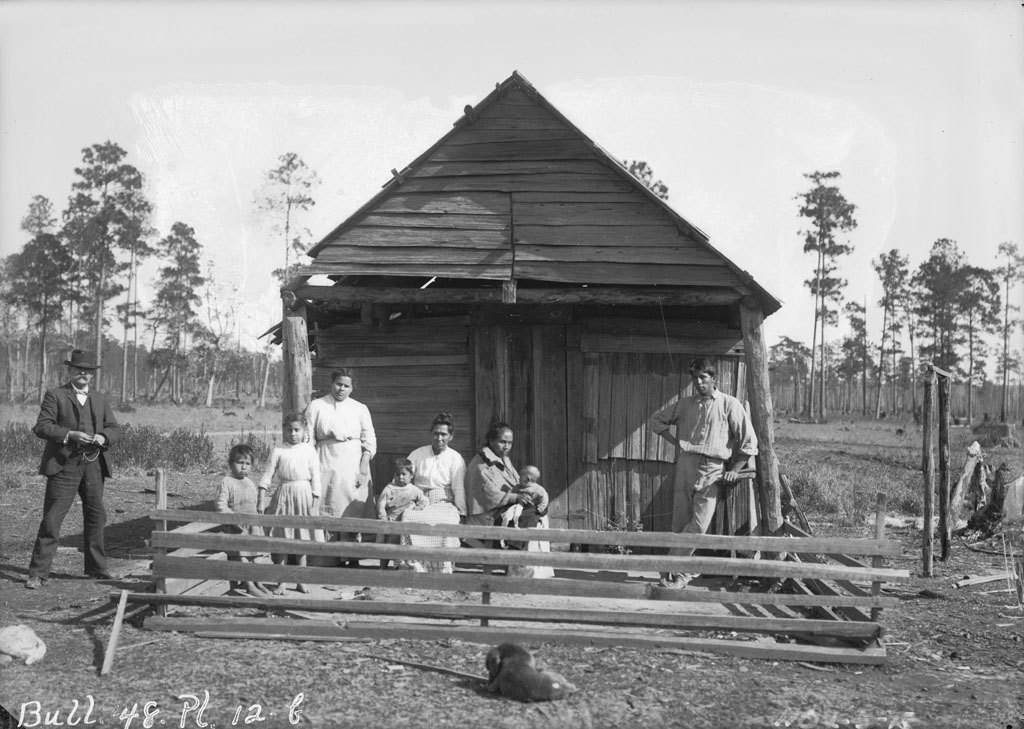
Louisiana Choctaws in front of their cabin in 1909

In March 1917, federal representatives held hearings, attended by around 100 Choctaws, to examine the needs of the Mississippi Choctaws. Some of the congressmen who presided over the hearings were: Charles D. Carter of Oklahoma, William W. Hastings of Oklahoma, Carl T. Hayden of Arizona, John N. Tillman of Arkansas, and William W. Venable of Mississippi. These hearings resulted in improvements such as improved access to health care, housing, and schools.

After Cato H. Sells investigated the Choctaws' condition, the U. S. Bureau of Indian Affairs established the Choctaw Agency on October 8, 1918. The Choctaw Agency was based in Philadelphia, Mississippi, the center of Indian activity. Dr. Frank J. McKinley was its first superintendent, and he was also the physician.

Before 1916, six Indian schools operated in three counties: two in Leake, three in Neshoba, and one in Newton. The names of those schools were: Tubby Rock Indian School, Calcutta Indian School, Revenue Indian school, Red Water Indian School, and Gum Springs Indian School. The Newton Indian school's name is not known. The agency established new schools in the following Indian communities: Bogue Chitto, Bogue Homo, Conehatta, Pearl River, Red Water, Standing Pine, and Tucker. Under segregation, few schools were open to Choctaw children, whom the white southerners classified as non-whites.

The Mississippi Choctaws' improvements may have continued if it wasn't dramatically interrupted by world events. World War I slowed down progress for the Indians as Washington's bureaucracy focused on the war. Some Mississippi Choctaws also served during the war. The Spanish Influenza also slowed progress as many Choctaws were killed by the world-wide epidemic.

=== World War I (1918) ===
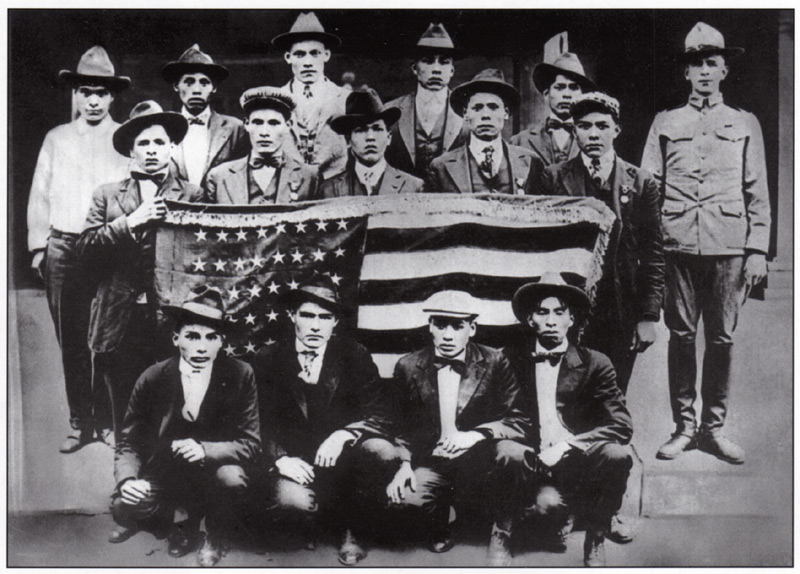
Choctaws in training in World War I for coded radio & telephone transmissions

In the closing days of World War I, a group of Oklahoma Choctaws serving in the U.S. Army used their native language as the basis for secret communication among Americans, as Germans could not understand it. They are now called the Choctaw Code Talkers. The Choctaws were the Native American innovators who served as code talkers. Captain Lawrence, a company commander, overheard Solomon Louis and Mitchell Bobb conversing in the Choctaw language. He learned there were eight Choctaw men in the battalion.

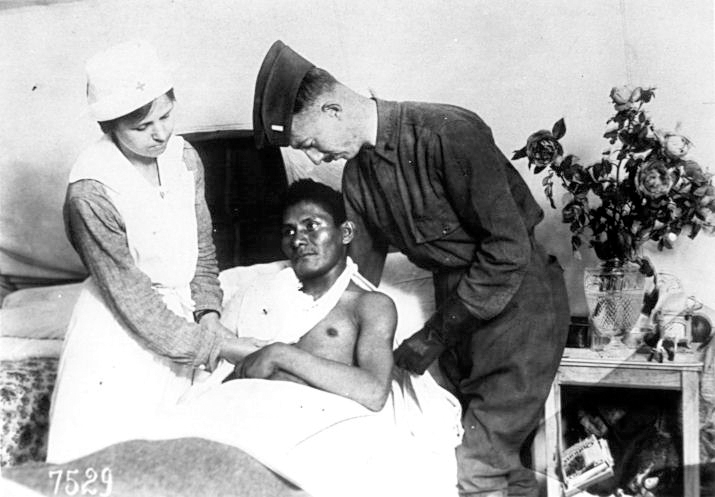
Wounded Choctaw soldier in World War I, U.S. National Red Cross Hospital No. 5, Auteuil, France

Fourteen Choctaw Indian men in the Army's 36th Division trained to use their language for military communications. Their communications, which could not be understood by Germans, helped the American Expeditionary Force win several key battles in the Meuse-Argonne Campaign in France, during the last big German offensive of the war. Within 24 hours after the US Army starting using the Choctaw speakers, they turned the tide of battle by controlling their communications. In less than 72 hours, the Germans were retreating and the Allies were on full attack. The 14 Choctaw Code Talkers were Albert Billy, Mitchell Bobb, Victor Brown, Ben Caterby, James Edwards, Tobias Frazer, Ben Hampton, Solomon Louis, Pete Maytubby, Jeff Nelson, Joseph Oklahombi, Robert Taylor, Calvin Wilson, and Captain Walter Veach.

More than 70 years passed before the contributions of the Choctaw Code talkers were fully recognized. On November 3, 1989, in recognition of the important role the Choctaw Code Talkers played during World War I, the French government presented the Chevalier de L'Ordre National du Mérite (the Knight of the National Order of Merit) to the Choctaws Code Talkers.

The US Army again used Choctaw speakers for coded language during World War II.

=== Reorganization (1934) ===
During the Great Depression and the Roosevelt Administration, officials began numerous initiatives to alleviate some of the social and economic conditions in the South. The 1933 Special Narrative Report described the dismal state of welfare of Mississippi Choctaws, whose population by 1930 had slightly increased to 1,665 people. John Collier, the US Commissioner for Indian Affairs (now BIA), had worked for a decade on Indian affairs and been developing ideas to change federal policy. He used the report as instrumental support to re-organize the Mississippi Choctaw as the Mississippi Band of Choctaw Indians. This enabled them to establish their own tribal government, and gain a beneficial relationship with the federal government.

In 1934, President Franklin Roosevelt signed into law the Indian Reorganization Act. This law proved critical for survival of the Mississippi Choctaw. Baxter York, Emmett York, and Joe Chitto worked on gaining recognition for the Choctaw. They realized that the only way to gain recognition was to adopt a constitution. A rival organization, the Mississippi Choctaw Indian Federation, opposed tribal recognition because of fears of dominance by the Bureau of Indian Affairs (BIA). They disbanded after leaders of the opposition were moved to another jurisdiction. The first Mississippi Band of Choctaw Indians tribal council members were Baxter and Emmett York with Joe Chitto as the first chairperson.

With the tribe's adoption of government, in 1944 the Secretary of the Interior declared that 18,000 acres (73 km^{2}) would be held in trust for the Choctaw of Mississippi. Lands in Neshoba and surrounding counties were set aside as a federal Indian reservation. Eight communities were included in the reservation land: Bogue Chitto, Bogue Homa, Conehatta, Crystal Ridge, Pearl River, Red Water, Tucker, and Standing Pine.

Under the Indian Reorganization Act, the Mississippi Choctaws re-organized on April 20, 1945, as the Mississippi Band of Choctaw Indians. This gave them some independence from the Democrat-dominated state government, which continued with enforcement of racial segregation and discrimination.

=== World War II (1941) ===
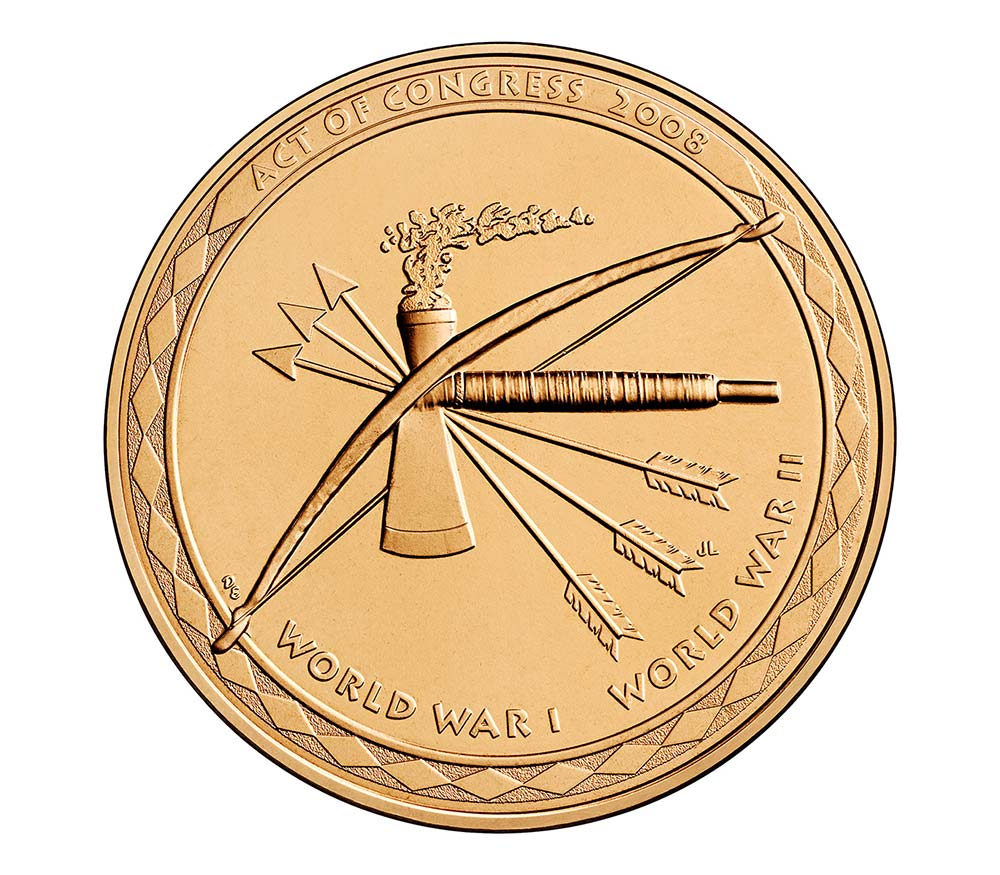
Congressional Gold Medal awarded for WWI and WWII service

World War II was a significant turning point for Choctaws and Native Americans in general. Although the Treaty of Dancing Rabbit Creek stated Mississippi Choctaws had U.S. citizenship, they had become associated with "colored people" as non-white in a state that had imposed racial segregation under Jim Crow laws. State services for Native Americans were non-existent. The state was poor and still dependent on agriculture. In its system of segregation, services for minorities were consistently underfunded. The state constitution and voter registration rules dating from the turn of the 20th century kept most Native Americans from voting, making them ineligible to serve on juries or to be candidates for local or state offices. They were without political representation.

A Mississippi Choctaw veteran stated, "Indians were not supposed to go in the military back then ... the military was mainly for whites. My category was white instead of Indian. I don't know why they did that. Even though Indians weren't citizens of this country, couldn't register to vote, didn't have a draft card or anything, they took us anyway."

Van Barfoot, a Choctaw from Mississippi, who was a sergeant and later a second lieutenant in the U.S. Army, 157th Infantry, 45th Infantry Division, received the Medal of Honor. Barfoot was commissioned a second lieutenant after he destroyed two German machine gun nests, took 17 prisoners, and disabled an enemy tank. Lt. Colonel Edward E. McClish from Oklahoma was a guerrilla leader in the Philippines.

=== Post-Reorganization ===
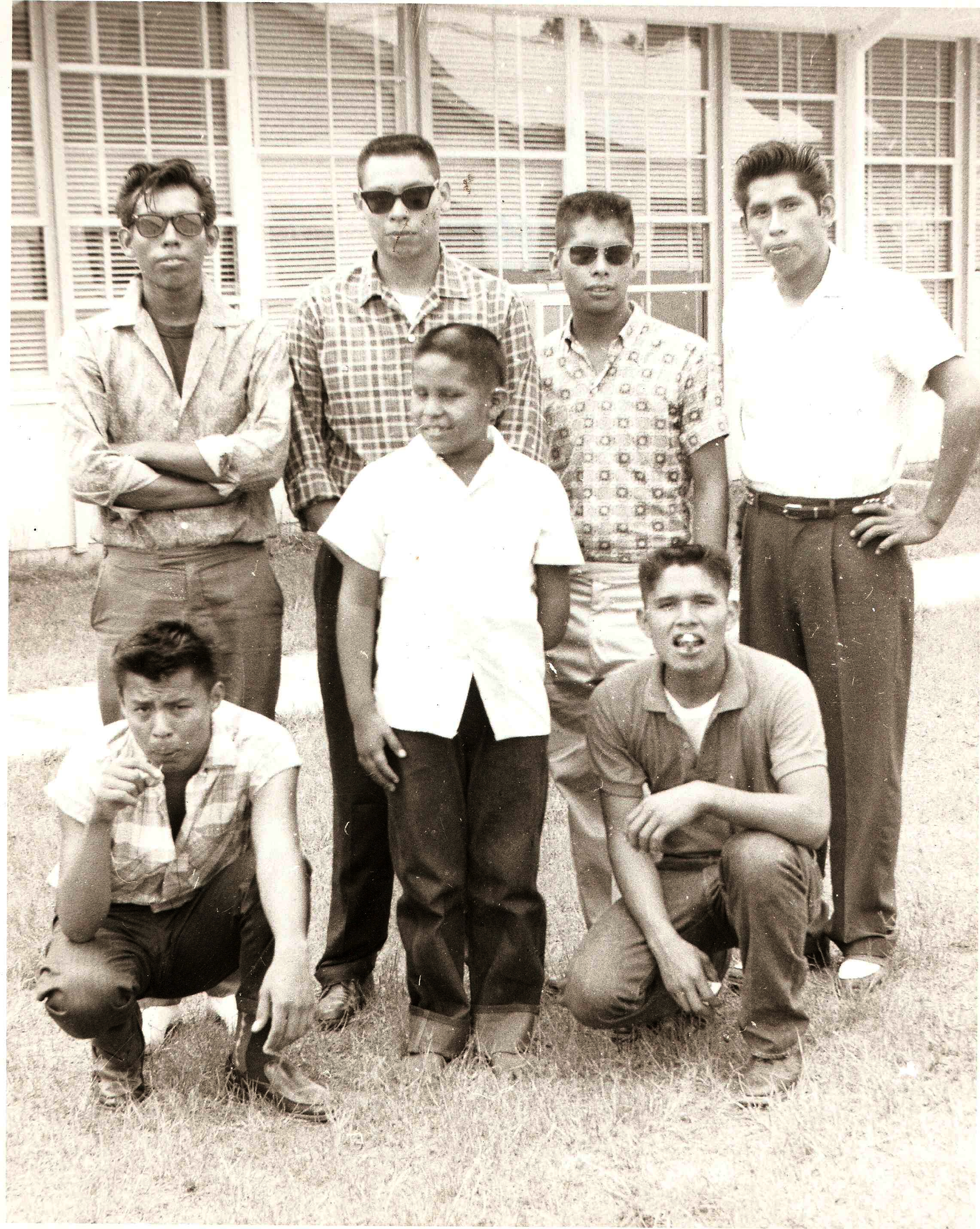
Group of Mississippi Choctaw males in the late 50s or early 60s. Photograph by Bob Ferguson.

The first Mississippi Band of Choctaw Indians regular tribal council meeting was held on July 10, 1945. The members were Joe Chitto (Chairman), J.C. Allen (Vice Chairman), Nicholas Bell (Secretary Treasurer), Tom Bell, Preatice Jackson, Dempsey Morris, Woodrow W. Jackson, Lonnie Anderson, Joseph Farve, Phillip Farve, Will Wilson, Hensley Gibson, Will Jimmie, Baxter York, Ennis Martin, and Jimpson McMillan.

After World War II, pressure in Congress mounted to reduce Washington's authority on Native American lands and liquidate the government's responsibilities to them. In 1953 the House of Representatives passed Resolution 108, proposing an end to federal services for 13 tribes deemed ready to handle their own affairs. The same year, Public Law 280 transferred jurisdiction over tribal lands to state and local governments in five states. Within a decade Congress terminated federal services to more than sixty groups despite intense opposition by Indians. Congress settled on a policy to terminate tribes as quickly as possible. Out of concern for the isolation of many Native Americans in rural areas, the federal government created relocation programs to cities to try to expand their employment opportunities. Indian policy experts hoped to expedite assimilation of Native Americans to the larger American society, which was becoming urban. In 1959, the Choctaw Termination Act was passed. Unless repealed by the federal government, the Choctaw Nation of Oklahoma would effectively be terminated as a sovereign nation as of August 25, 1970.

President John F. Kennedy halted further termination in 1961 and decided against implementing additional terminations. He did enact some of the last terminations in process, such as with the Ponca. Both presidents Lyndon Johnson and Richard Nixon repudiated termination of the federal government's relationship with Native American tribes.

We must affirm the right of the first Americans to remain Indians while exercising their rights as Americans. We must affirm their right to freedom of choice and self-determination. We must seek new ways to provide Federal assistance to Indians-with new emphasis on Indian self-help and with respect for Indian culture. And we must assure the Indian people that it is our desire and intention that the special relationship between the Indian and his government grow and flourish. For, the first among us must be not be last.

— President Lyndon Johnson, Message to Congress "The Forgotten American", March 6, 1968.

==== Mississippi Choctaw Self-Determination era ====
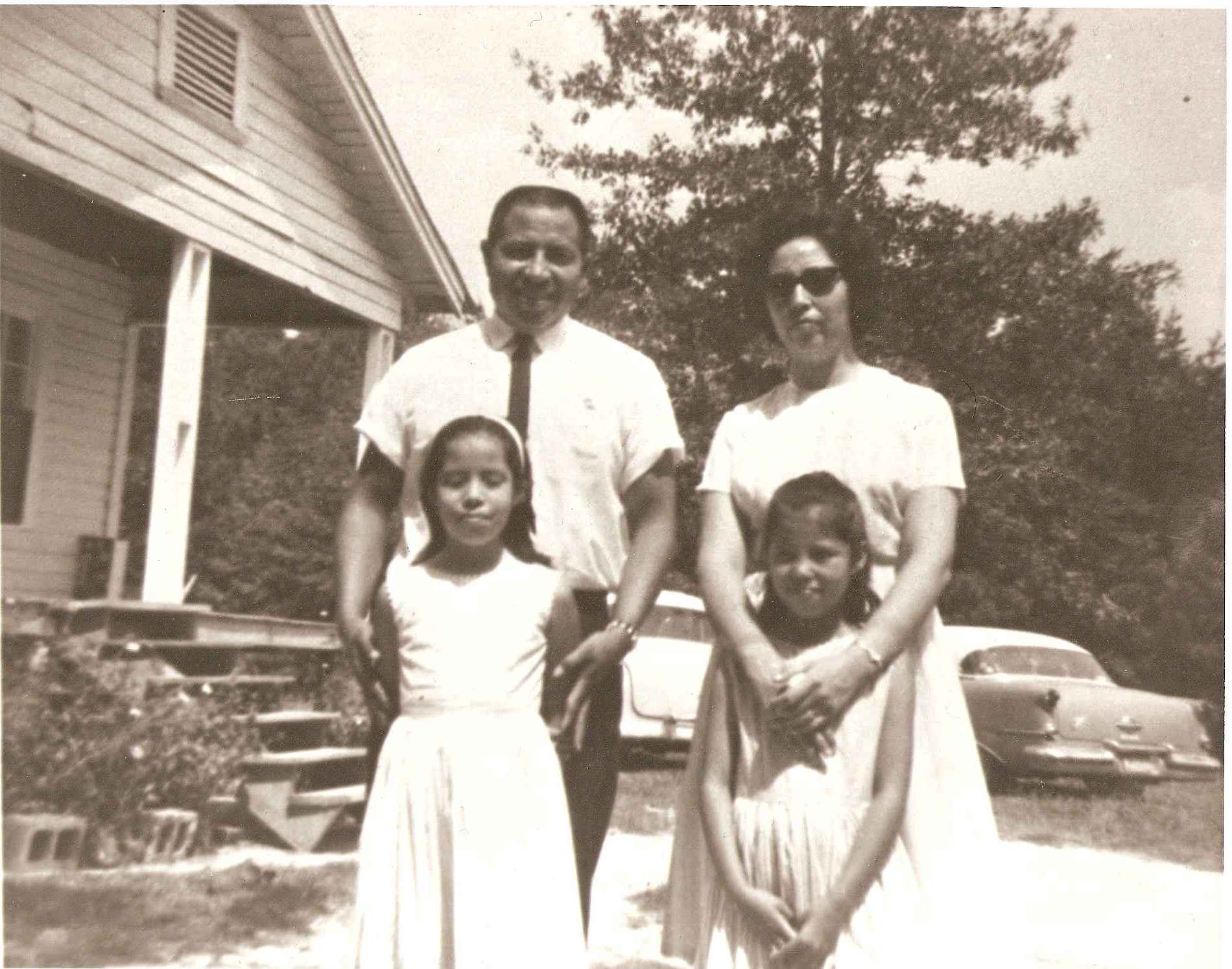
Phillip Martin and family in the late 1950s or early 1960s

The Choctaw people continued to struggle economically due to bigotry, cultural isolation, and lack of jobs. The Choctaw, who for 150 years had been neither white nor black, were "left where they had always been"—in poverty. Will D. Campbell, a Baptist minister and Civil Rights activist, witnessed the destitution of the Choctaw. He would later write, "the thing I remember the most ... was the depressing sight of the Choctaws, their shanties along the country roads, grown men lounging on the dirt streets of their villages in demeaning idleness, sometimes drinking from a common bottle, sharing a roll-your-own cigarette, their half-clad children a picture of hurting that would never end." With reorganization and establishment of tribal government, however, over the next decades they took control of "schools, health care facilities, legal and judicial systems, and social service programs."

The Choctaws witnessed the social forces that brought Freedom Summer and its after effects to their ancient homeland. The civil rights movement produced significant social change for the Choctaw in Mississippi, as their civil rights were enhanced. Prior to the Civil Rights Act of 1964, most jobs were given to whites, then blacks. Donna Ladd wrote that a Choctaw, now in her 40s, remembers "as a little girl, she thought that a 'white only' sign in a local store meant she could only order white, or vanilla, ice cream. It was a small story, but one that shows how a third race can easily get left out of the attempts for understanding." On June 21, 1964, James Chaney, Andrew Goodman, and Michael Schwerner (renowned civil rights workers) disappeared; their remains were later found in a newly constructed dam. A crucial turning point in the FBI investigation came when the charred remains of the murdered civil rights workers' station wagon was found on a Mississippi Choctaw reservation. Two Choctaw women, who were in the back seat of a deputy's patrol car, said they witnessed the meeting of two conspirators who expressed their desire to "beat-up" the boys. The end of legalized racial segregation permitted the Choctaws to participate in public institutions and facilities that had been reserved exclusively for white patrons.

Phillip Martin, who had served in the U. S. Army in Europe during World War II, returned to visit his former Neshoba County, Mississippi, home. After seeing the poverty of his people, he decided to stay to help. Martin served as chairperson in various Choctaw committees up until 1977.

Martin was elected as Chief of the Mississippi Band of Choctaw Indians. He served a total of 30 years, being re-elected until 2007. Martin died in Jackson, Mississippi, on February 4, 2010. He was eulogized as a visionary leader, who had lifted his people out of poverty with businesses and casinos built on tribal land.

== 1960s to present ==
In the social changes around the civil rights era, between 1965 and 1982 many Choctaw Native Americans renewed their commitments to the value of their ancient heritage. Working to celebrate their own strengths and exercise appropriate rights; they dramatically reversed the trend toward abandonment of Indian culture and tradition. During the 1960s, Community Action programs connected with Native Americans were based on citizen participation. In the 1970s, the Choctaw repudiated the extremes of Indian activism. The Oklahoma Choctaw sought a local grassroots solution to reclaim their cultural identity and sovereignty as a nation. The Mississippi Choctaw would lay the foundations of business ventures.

Federal policy under President Richard M. Nixon encouraged giving tribes more authority for self-determination, within a policy of federal recognition. Realizing the damage that had been done by termination of tribal status, he ended the federal emphasis of the 1950s on termination of certain tribes' federally recognized status and relationships with the federal government:

Forced termination is wrong, in my judgment, for a number of reasons. First, the premises on which it rests are wrong ... The second reason for rejecting forced termination is that the practical results have been clearly harmful in the few instances in which termination actually has been tried ... The third argument I would make against forced termination concerns the effect it has had upon the overwhelming majority of tribes which still enjoy a special relationship with the Federal government ... The recommendations of this administration represent an historic step forward in Indian policy. We are proposing to break sharply with past approaches to Indian problems.

— President Richard Nixon, Special Message on Indian Affairs, July 8, 1970.

Soon after this, Congress passed the landmark Indian Self-Determination and Education Assistance Act of 1975; this completed a 15-year period of federal policy reform with regard to American Indian tribes. The legislation authorized processes by which tribes could negotiate contracts with the BIA to manage directly more of their education and social service programs. In addition, it provided direct grants to help tribes develop plans for assuming such responsibility. It also provided for Indian parents' participation on local school boards.

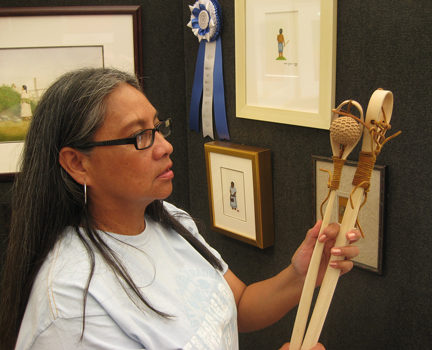
Norma Howard (Choctaw Nation of Oklahoma), award-winning watercolor painter, with Choctaw stickball sticks made by her son.

Beginning in 1979 the Mississippi Choctaw tribal council worked on a variety of economic development initiatives, first geared toward attracting industry to the reservation. They had many people available to work, natural resources, and no state or federal taxes. Industries have included automotive parts, greeting cards, direct mail and printing, and plastic-molding. The Mississippi Band of Choctaw Indians is one of the state's largest employers, running 19 businesses and employing 7,800 people.

Starting with New Hampshire in 1963, numerous state governments began to operate lotteries and other gambling in order to raise money for government services, often promoting the programs by promising to earmark revenues to fund education, for instance. In 1987 the Supreme Court of the United States ruled that federally recognized tribes could operate gaming facilities on reservations, as this was sovereign territory, and be free from state regulation. As tribes began to develop gaming, starting with bingo, in 1988 the U.S. Congress enacted the Indian Gaming Regulatory Act (IGRA). It set the broad terms for Native American tribes to operate casinos, requiring that they do so only in states that had already authorized private gaming. Since then development of casino gaming has been one of the chief sources for many tribes of new revenues.

The Choctaw Nation of Oklahoma developed gaming operations and a related resort: the Choctaw Casino Resort and Choctaw Casino Bingo are their popular gaming destinations in Durant. Located near the Oklahoma-Texas border, these sites attract residents of Southern Oklahoma and North Texas. The largest regional population base from which they draw is the Dallas-Fort Worth Metroplex.

The Mississippi Band of Choctaw Indians (MBCI) unsuccessfully sought state agreement to develop gaming under the Ray Mabus administration. But in 1992 Mississippi Governor Kirk Fordice gave permission for the MBCI to develop Class III gaming. They have developed one of the largest casino resorts in the nation; it is located in Philadelphia, Mississippi, near the Pearl River. The Silver Star Casino opened its doors in 1994. The Golden Moon Casino opened in 2002. The casinos are collectively known as the Pearl River Resort.

After nearly two hundred years, the Choctaw have regained control of the ancient sacred site of Nanih Waiya. Mississippi protected the site for years as a state park. In 2006, the state legislature passed a bill to return Nanih Waiya to the Choctaw.

=== Jack Abramoff and Indian casino lobbying ===
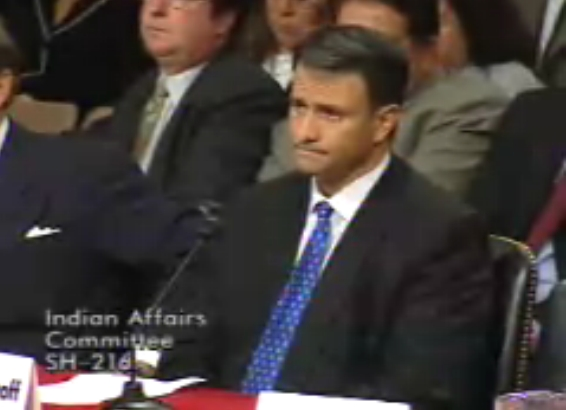
Image from video of Senate Indian Affairs Committee Hearing on 'Lobbying Practices Involving Indian Tribes' on September 29, 2004

In the second half of the 1990s, lobbyist Jack Abramoff was employed by Preston Gates Ellis & Rouvelas Meeds LLP, the lobbying arm in Washington, D.C., of the Preston Gates & Ellis LLP law firm based in Seattle, Washington. In 1995, Abramoff began representing Native American tribes who wanted to develop gambling casinos, starting with the Mississippi Band of Choctaw Indians.

The Choctaw originally had lobbied the federal government directly, but beginning in 1994, they found that many of the congressional members who had responded to their issues had either retired or were defeated in the "Republican Revolution" of the 1994 elections. Nell Rogers, the tribe's specialist on legislative affairs, had a friend who was familiar with the work of Abramoff and his father as Republican activists. The tribe contacted Preston Gates, and soon after hired the firm and Abramoff.

Abramoff succeeded in gaining defeat of a Congressional bill to use the unrelated business income tax (UBIT) to tax Native American casinos; it was sponsored by Reps. Bill Archer (R-TX) and Ernest Istook (R-OK). Since the matter involved taxation, Abramoff enlisted help from Grover Norquist, a Republican acquaintance from college, and his Americans for Tax Reform (ATR). The bill was eventually defeated in 1996 in the Senate, due in part to grassroots work by ATR. The Choctaw paid $60,000 in fees to Abramoff.

According to Washington Business Forward, a lobbying trade magazine, Senator Tom DeLay was also a major figure in achieving defeat of the bill. The fight strengthened Abramoff's alliance with him.

Purporting to represent Native Americans before Congress and state governments in the developing field of gaming, Jack Abramoff and Michael Scanlon used fraudulent means to gain profits of $15 million in total payments from the Mississippi Band of Choctaw Indians. After Congressional oversight hearings were held in 2004 on the lobbyists' activities, federal criminal charges were brought against Abramoff and Scanlon. In an e-mail sent January 29, 2002, Abramoff had written to Scanlon, "I have to meet with the monkeys from the Choctaw tribal council."

On January 3, 2006, Abramoff pleaded guilty to three felony counts — conspiracy, fraud, and tax evasion. The charges were based principally on his lobbying activities in Washington on behalf of Native American tribes. In addition, Abramoff and other defendants must make restitution of at least $25 million that was defrauded from clients, most notably the Native American tribes.

=== 2011 Federal Bureau of Investigation raid ===
In July 2011, agents from the FBI "seized" Pearl River Resort informational assets. The Los Angeles Times reported that the Indians are "faced with infighting over a disputed election for tribal chief and an FBI investigation targeting the tribe's casinos."

=== State-recognized tribes ===
Two US states recognize tribes that are not recognized by the US federal government.

Alabama recognizes the MOWA Band of Choctaw Indians, who have a 600-acre reservation in southwestern Alabama and a total enrolled population of 3,600. The band is closely affiliated with Calcedeaver Elementary School in Mount Vernon, Alabama, a connection credited as a source of the school's success.

Louisiana recognizes the Choctaw-Apache Tribe of Ebarb, Clifton Choctaw, and Louisiana Choctaw Tribe.

== Population history ==
The highest of early estimates - possibly representing the population peak - is that of Le Page du Pratz who estimated the Choctaw at 25,000 warriors (and therefore around 125,000 people) in year 1718. Other estimates from that time period were usually lower, but it is possible that they represented only a part of the tribe. Similar figures were given by St. Denis who estimated the Choctaw at 18,000 warriors (or 90,000 people) in 1714 and by W. Bull who estimated them at 16,000 warriors (or 80,000 people) in 1738. According to B. R. Carroll the Choctaw were reckoned by the French to be the most numerous nation of Indians in America and consisted of many thousand men. John R. Swanton enumerated a total of 102 Choctaw villages and towns in his book. Robert Rogers estimated the Choctaw at 10,000 warriors in 1775 (indicating a total population of 50,000). According to Gilbert Imlay they mustered 6,000 warriors around the year 1800 (implying a total population of 30,000). Jedidiah Morse estimated the Choctaw at 25,000 people in about 1820, shortly before the removal. A report by the Commissioner of Indian Affairs dated 25 November 1841 indicates that 15,177 Choctaws had been removed to Oklahoma (Indian Territory) while 3,323 stayed in the east. Emmanuel Domenech estimated the Choctaw at up to 25,000 in about 1860. The Indian Office in 1856 reported them as 22,707. Enumeration published in 1886 counted 18,000 Choctaws in Oklahoma as of year 1884. Around the years 1916–1919 there were in Oklahoma 17,488 Choctaws by blood, 1,651 by intermarriage and 6,029 freedmen, and in addition to that there were also at that time 3,099 Mississippi Choctaws and around 200 Choctaws living elsewhere.

During the 20th and 21st centuries Choctaw population has rebounded, in 2020 they numbered 254,154.

In the 2010 US Census, there were people who identified as Choctaw living in every state of the Union. The states with the largest Choctaw populations were:

- Oklahoma – 79,006
- Texas – 24,024
- California – 23,403
- Mississippi – 9,260
- Arkansas – 4,840
- Alabama – 4,513
