= Choctaw Casino Bingo =

Defunct Choctaw-owned casino in Oklahoma, U.S.

- Interactive map of Choctaw Casino Bingo
- Location: Durant, Oklahoma, U.S.; 34.01656°N 96.39318°W
- Opened: 1987
- Closed: January 2010
- Owner: Choctaw Nation of Oklahoma

Choctaw Casino Bingo in Durant, Oklahoma was the first Choctaw casino to be constructed, in 1987, and was also the original casino before the construction of new Choctaw Casino Resort in 2005. Since the construction of the original casino, it has since then sparked growth for the Choctaw gaming industry.

In 1988, the voters of the state of Oklahoma passed a law that allowed 3 different classes of gambling in the state of Oklahoma. Choctaw Casino Bingo was one of the first facilities to take advantage of the new law. Changes in the law led to the introduction of Las Vegas style slot machines and video games as well as table games including Blackjack and Poker.

Choctaw Casino Bingo was owned and operated by the Choctaw Nation of Oklahoma. Profits contribute to many development programs used to benefit local communities and the Choctaw Nation of Oklahoma.

== Tourists ==
The Choctaw Casino Bingo and the Choctaw Casino Resort form a huge gaming complex that is a popular tourist destination for Durant, the State of Oklahoma, the Dallas–Fort Worth metroplex, North Texas, western Arkansas, and northwestern Louisiana.

== Entertainment ==
Choctaw Casino Bingo provided on-site entertainment, lodging amenities at the Choctaw Casino Resort Hotel, as well as, the plethora of gaming options within the casino. Gaming opportunities include over 700 gaming machines, live dealer assisted blackjack, and a bingo pavilion large enough to accommodate over 600 bingo patrons.

== Closing ==
Upon the opening of the new Choctaw Casino Resort, the Choctaw Casino Bingo closed in January 2010.

== Sources ==
- "Gaming Machines in Oklahoma". The Journal Record. February 2005. Archived from the original on April 20, 2005 – via FindArticles.
- National Indian Gaming Commission
