= Choctaw Casinos & Resorts =

Native American chain of casinos and hotels

Coordinates: 33°57′07″N 96°24′52″W

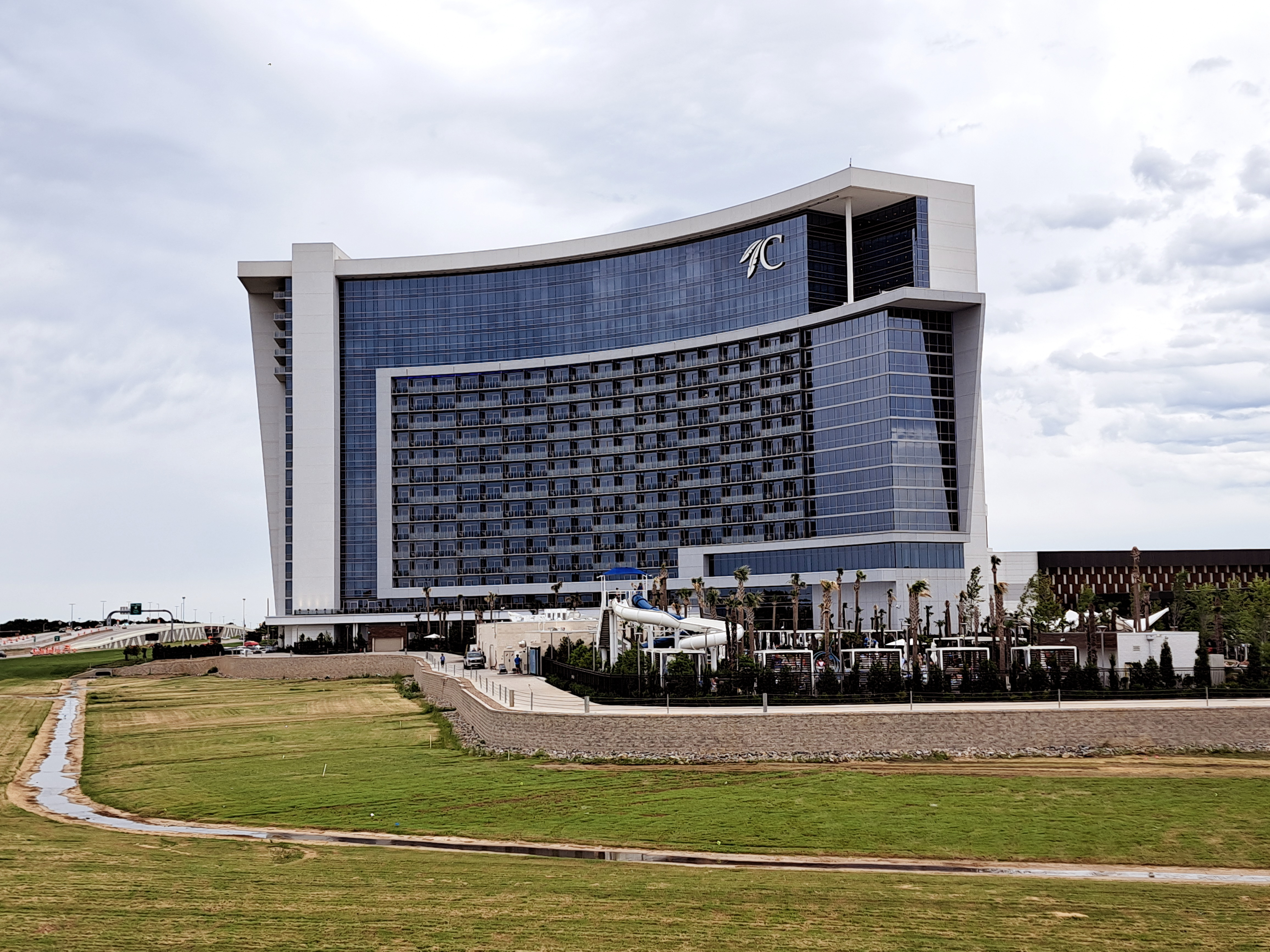
- Choctaw Casino & Resort Sky Tower in Durant
- Interactive map of Choctaw Casinos & Resorts
- Opened: March 8, 2006 (Durant location)
- No. of rooms: various
- Gaming space: 218,844 sq ft (20,331.3 m^{2}) (Durant location)
- Notable restaurants: Butterfields Buffet; 1832 Steakhouse; Salt & Stone; The League Guy Fieri's American Kitchen + Bar; Starbucks; Gilley's Durant; Grand Cafe; Grand Bakery; Velvet Taco; Bamboo Noodle Bar; Cinnabon; Smashburger; Papa John's Pizza; Krispy Krunchy Chicken; Italia Kitchen; South Hot Chicken; The Pit; Slush'd Frozen Daquiris
- Casino type: Native American
- Owner: Choctaw Nation of Oklahoma
- Renovated in: 2008, 2015, 2021
- Website: Choctaw Casino Resort

Choctaw Casinos & Resorts is a chain of eight Native American casinos and hotels, and 15 Casino Toos, located in Oklahoma, owned and operated by the Choctaw Nation of Oklahoma.

The original location in Durant has 218,844 sq ft (20,331.3 m^{2}) of gaming floor, over 7,400 slot machines, and 1,616 hotel rooms. The resort has three casinos and three hotels within the complex. The South Casino was completed in 2006 with 108,844 sq ft (10,111.9 m^{2}) of floor space, and the North Casino was completed in 2010 with 110,000 sq ft (10,000 m^{2}) more floor space. The Grand Tower has 204,000 sq ft (19,000 m^{2}) of floor space, 330 rooms and suites, and is 12 floors tall. The Spa Tower was opened in 2015 as another expansion for the resort adding 286 rooms and suites. The latest Sky Tower adds 1,000 hotel rooms and suites to the property and is part of the latest expansion opened in 2021. The $860 million resort is the flagship of the Choctaw Nation gaming industry.

== Locations ==
- Choctaw Casino–Broken Bow
- Choctaw Casino–Idabel
- Choctaw Casino–McAlester
- Choctaw Casino–Stringtown
- Choctaw Casino & Resort–Durant (flagship)
- Choctaw Casino & Resort–Grant
- Choctaw Casino & Resort–Pocola
- Choctaw Landing

=== Casino Too ===
In addition to the 8 stand-alone casinos, Choctaw also operates 15 casinos inside their Choctaw Travel Plazas which are referred to as Casino Toos. They are located in the following towns: Antlers, Atoka, Broken Bow, Calera, Durant, Grant, Heavener, Hugo, Idabel, McAlester, Pocola, Poteau, Stigler, Stringtown, and Wilburton.

== History ==
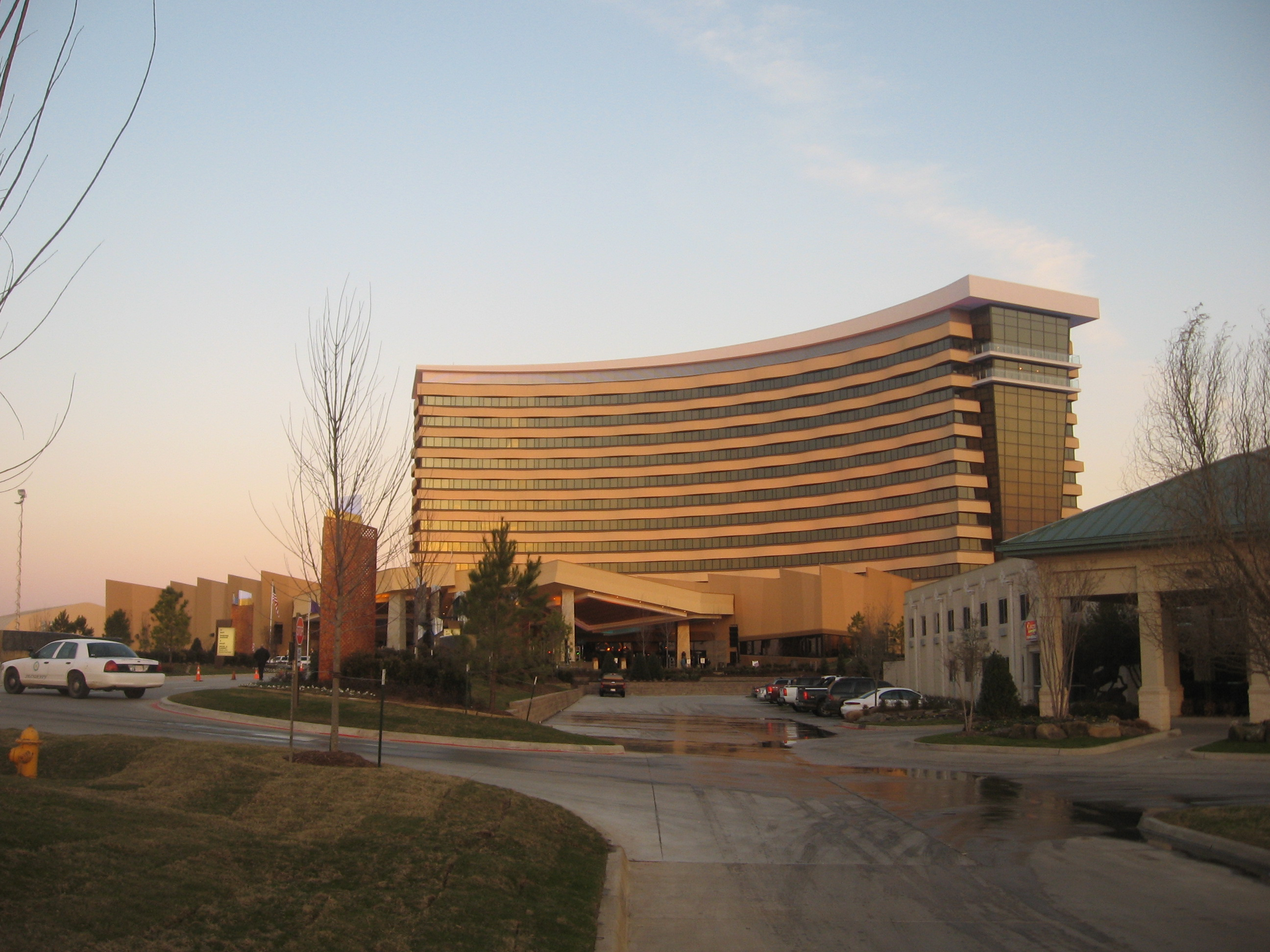
Looking east towards the North Casino and Grand Tower.

Choctaw Casino & Resort - Durant sits on a 50-acre site, adjacent to the former Choctaw Casino Bingo. The Choctaw Casino Bingo was built in 1987 and was the first of the Choctaw gaming franchise. In 2006, the original $60 million resort (now known as the Link Casino) was completed with construction. Soon after completion, tribal officials determined they built too small for their clientele and went underway with an expansion. In February 2010, a larger casino was built adjacent to the existing resort and became known as the Grand Casino. The Grand Hotel Tower is built atop the Grand Casino. The Bingo Hall then closed, shortly after the opening of the expansion.

== Durant ==
=== Tourism ===
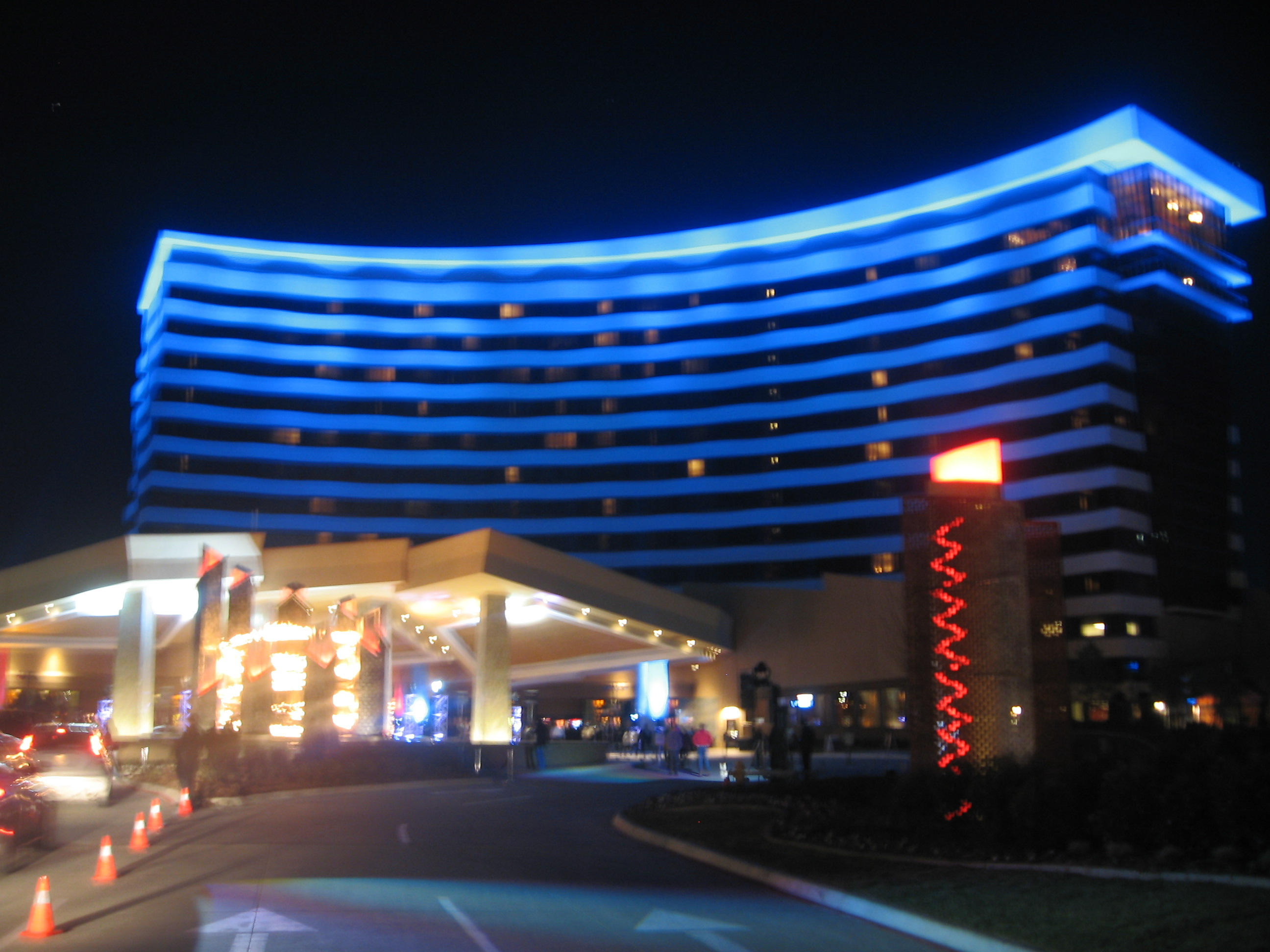
The North Casino and Grand Tower at night.

Choctaw Casino & Resort - Durant is a major tourist destination for Durant, the State of Oklahoma, North Texas, including the Dallas–Fort Worth metroplex, Arkansas, Louisiana, and Kansas. Some 20,000-25,000 people patronize the facility each week, about 1,200,000 annually. About 75 percent of the casino's customers are from Texas, and the casino is heavily marketed on television, radio, and the internet to people in the Dallas–Fort Worth area. Marketing materials put emphasis on the casino's location as being "One Hour North of Dallas."

=== Facilities ===
==== The Oasis ====
In addition to the casino's gaming floor, the Choctaw Casino & Resort features The Oasis swimming area where visitors will find multiple pool areas, water slides, Jacuzzis, cabanas, and dive-in movies being shown on an inflatable screen during the summer months. It is currently closed for renovations as of Spring of 2023.

==== Aqua at Sky Tower ====
Aqua includes 3 acres of swimming for all ages. With two separate pools, Aqua has a family pool and Adults pool (21+ only). Amenities of Aqua include water slides, a swim-up bar, cabanas, hot tubs, and more.

==== Choctaw Wellness Center ====
The Choctaw Wellness Center has amenities including a full gymnasium and an indoor walking track. This facility is only open for Choctaw Tribal members or team members of the Choctaw Nation of Oklahoma.

==== The District ====
Completed in September 2015, the District is an entertainment center with attractions including a video arcade, movie theater, bowling alley, and virtual reality arena. The District is a non-smoking area.

==== Sky Tower ====
Choctaw Resort of Durant was expanded with a Sky Tower featuring 21 floors and 1,000 hotel rooms. This expansion opened in August 2021.

== Choctaw Nation ==
The Choctaw casinos in Oklahoma are owned and operated by the Choctaw Nation of Oklahoma. Proceeds from the casino are used to fund many development and education programs benefiting local communities and the Choctaw Nation of Oklahoma.

== See also ==
- List of integrated resorts

== Sources ==
- Choctaw Casinos Oklahoma
- Choctaw Nation of Oklahoma
- Oklahoma Indian Gaming Association
- National Indian Gaming Commission
- Choctaw Casino Resort - The District
