= Political positions of Ronald Reagan =

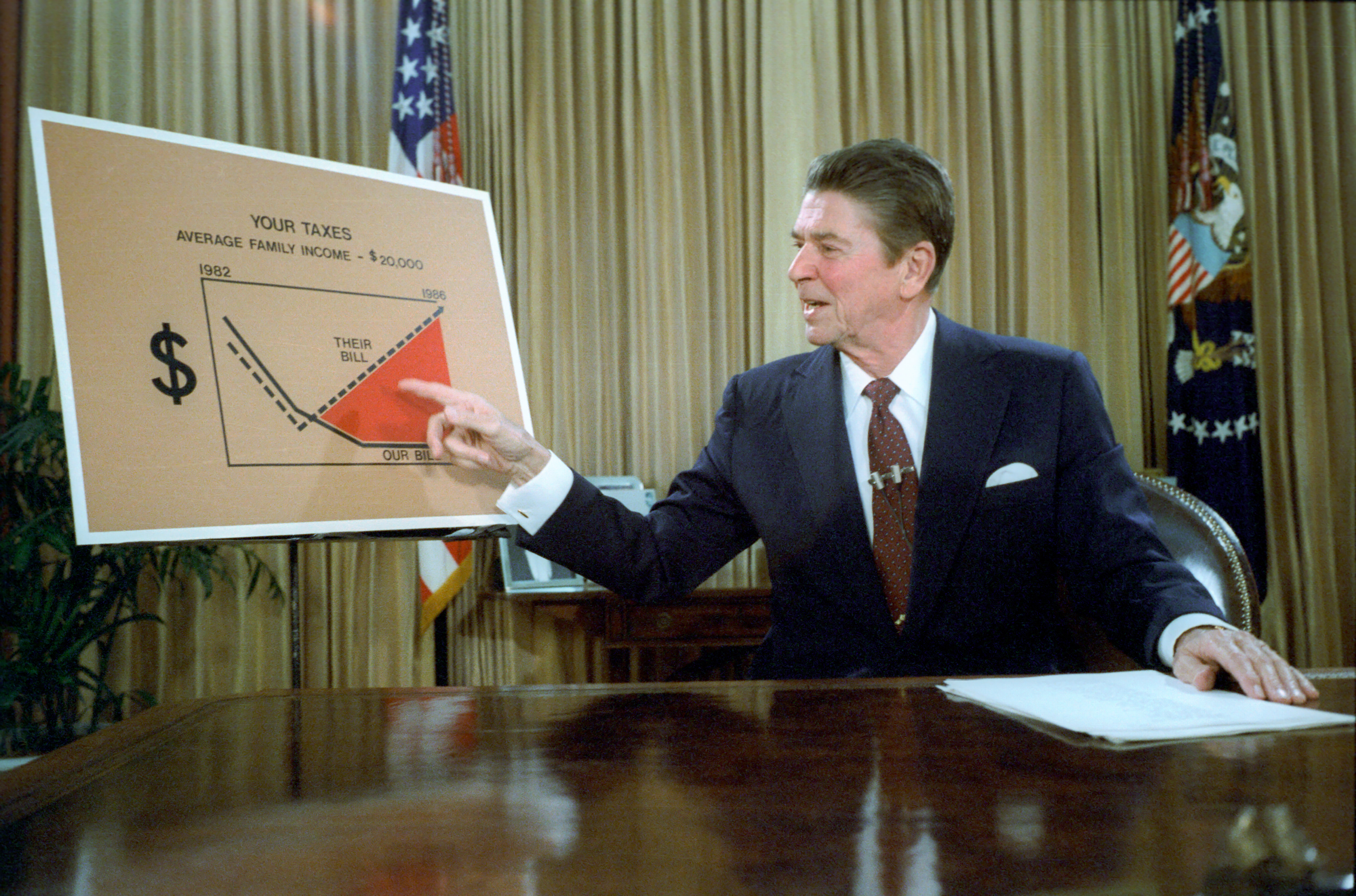
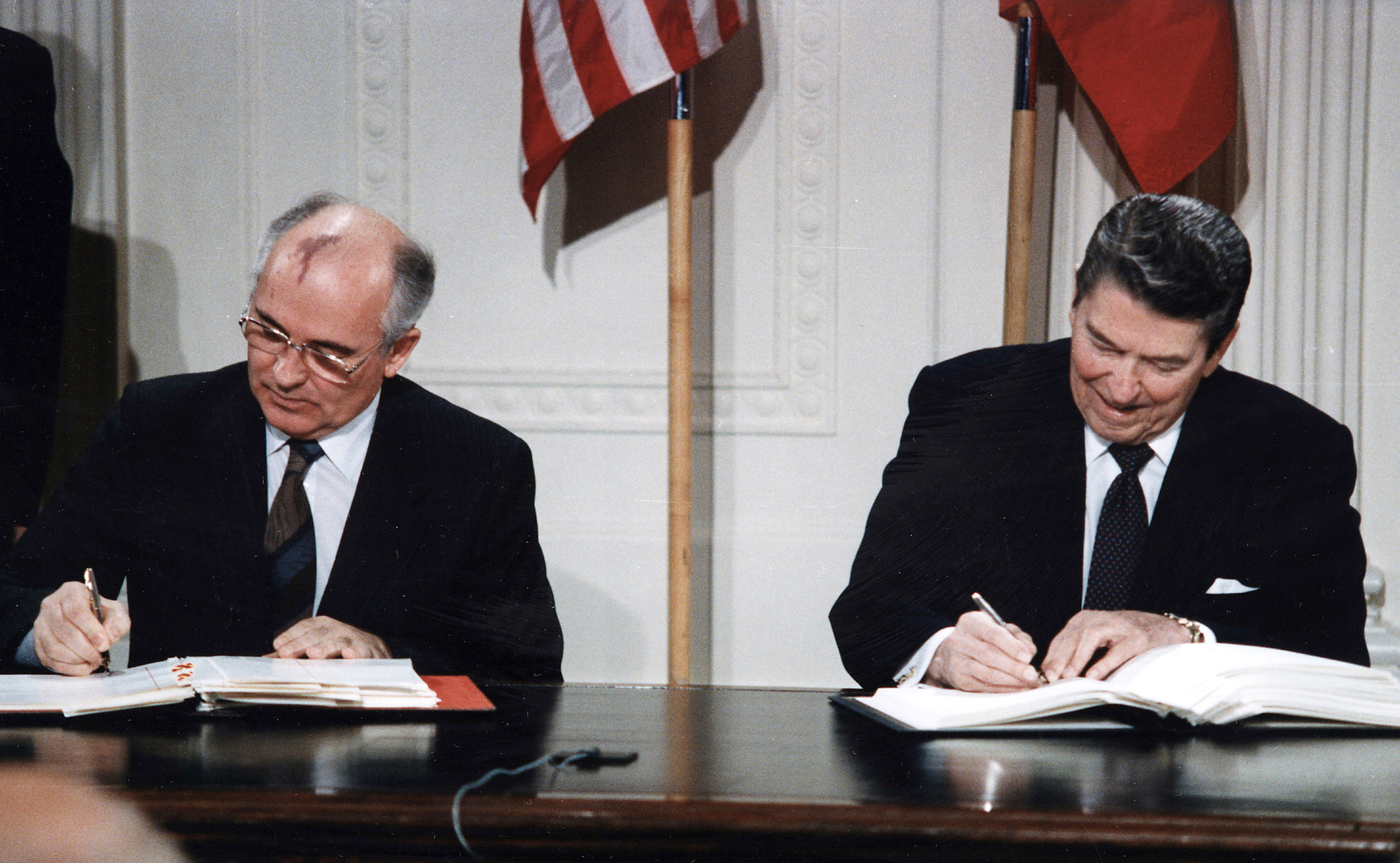
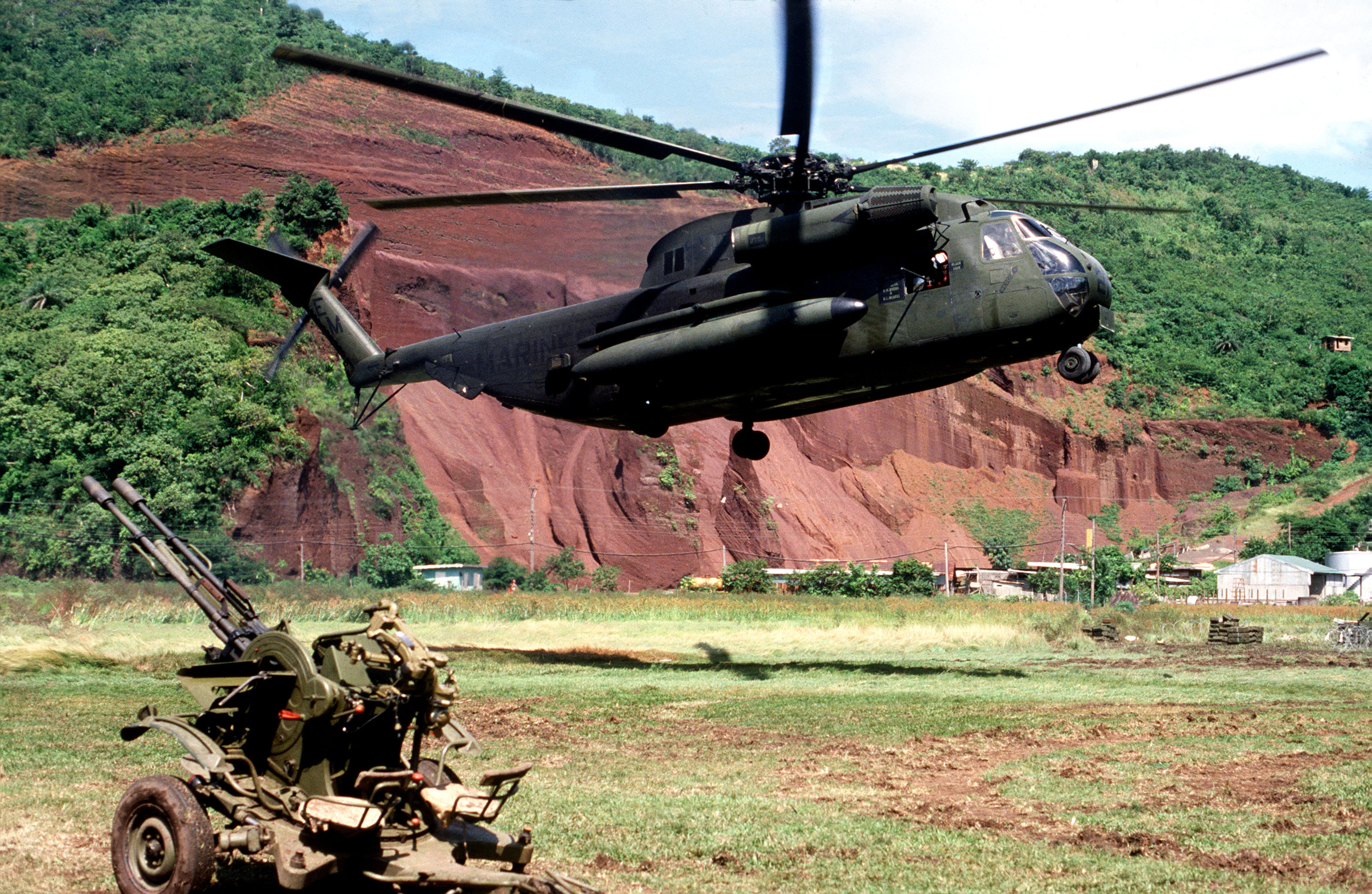
From left to right, top to bottom:
- Reagan promoting supply-side "Reaganomics"
- Reagan and Soviet General Secretary Mikhail Gorbachev signing the INF Treaty
- Invasion of Grenada, organized by Reagan

Ronald Reagan was the 40th president of the United States from 1981 to 1989. Previously, he was the 33rd governor of California from 1967 to 1975 and acted in Hollywood films from 1937 to 1964, the same year he energized the American conservative movement. Reagan's basic foreign policy was to equal and surpass the Soviet Union in military strength and put it on the road to what he called "the ash heap of history". By 1985, he began to cooperate closely with Soviet leader Mikhail Gorbachev, with whom he became friends and negotiated large-scale disarmament projects. The Cold War was fading away and suddenly ended as the Soviets lost control of Eastern Europe almost overnight in October 1989, nine months after Reagan was replaced in the White House by his vice president, George H. W. Bush, who was following Reagan's policies. The dissolution of the Soviet Union took place in December 1991. In terms of the Reagan Doctrine, he promoted military, financial, and diplomatic support for anti-communist insurgencies in Afghanistan, Nicaragua, and numerous other countries. For the most part, local communist power collapsed when the Soviet Union collapsed.

In domestic affairs, at a time of stagflation with high unemployment and high inflation, Reagan took dramatic steps. They included a major tax cut and large-scale deregulation of business activities. He took steps to weaken labor unions and found a bipartisan long-term fix to protect the Social Security system. Although Reagan had support from the religious right, he generally avoided or downplayed social issues such as abortion, homosexuality, and racial integration. Reagan spoke out for prayers in public schools, but did not promote a constitutional amendment to allow it. Fighting drugs was a high priority. He also appointed the first woman to the Supreme Court. Reagan became an iconic figure who has been praised by later Republican presidential candidates.

== Leadership ==
"Ronald Reagan was convivial, upbeat, courteous, respectful, self-confident, and humble. But he was also opaque, remote, distant, and inscrutable," says historian Melvyn P. Leffler. According to James P. Pfiffner, University Professor of Public Policy at George Mason University, Reagan was a larger-than-life character, a formidable politician, and an important president. His complexity produced a "presidency of paradoxes," in which dramatic successes mingled with unfortunate failures. His strengths included broad vision and clear direction. Voters appreciated his optimism, geniality, and gracious nature, which made his ideals seem all that more attractive. He believed that all national problems were simple problems and had faith in simple solutions. That strengthened his resolve, but also led to failures when there were deep complications. Paradoxically, his victories depended on his willingness to make pragmatic compromises without forsaking his ideals.

Reagan himself made the major policy decisions and often overruled his top advisers in cases such as the Reykjavík Summit in 1986, and his 1987 speech calling for tearing down the Berlin Wall. He was concerned with very broad issues, as well as anecdotal evidence to support his beliefs. He paid very little attention to details and elaborate briefings. When senior officials did not work out, such as Secretary of State Alexander Haig, they were fired. Reagan went through a series of six national security advisers before settling on people he trusted.

Reagan's choice of advisers sometimes backfired, such as when National Security Adviser John Poindexter and his aide Oliver North engaged in a secret deal with Iran called the Iran–Contra affair that seriously damaged Reagan's reputation. Reagan had rarely traveled abroad and relied on an inner circle of advisers who were not foreign policy experts, including his wife Nancy, James Baker, Edwin Meese, and Michael Deaver. After Haig was dismissed, he was replaced by George P. Shultz, who proved much more collaborative and has been generally admired by historians. Other key players included William J. Casey, director of the CIA, William P. Clark, national security advisor, and Jeane Kirkpatrick, Ambassador to the United Nations. Casper W. Weinberger, Secretary of Defense, successfully rebuilt and expanded the military but did not coordinate well with the foreign policy leadership.

== Foreign policy ==
=== Cold War ===
Reagan served as President during the last part of the Cold War, an era of escalating ideological disagreements and preparations for war between the United States and the Soviet Union. Reagan in 1982 denounced the enemy as an "evil empire" that would be consigned to the "ash heap of history" and he later predicted that communism would collapse.

Reagan reversed the policy of détente and massively built up the United States military.

Reagan proposed the Strategic Defense Initiative (SDI), a defense project that planned to use ground and space-based missile defense systems to protect the United States from attack. Reagan believed that this defense shield could make nuclear war impossible. Reagan was convinced that the Soviet Union could be defeated rather than simply negotiated with.

=== Policy toward the USSR ===
Reagan forcefully confronted the Soviet Union, marking a sharp departure from the détente observed by his predecessors Richard Nixon, Gerald Ford, and Jimmy Carter. Under the assumption that the Soviet Union was financially unable to match the United States in a renewed arms race, he accelerated increases in defense spending begun during the Carter Administration and strove to make the Cold War economically and rhetorically hot.

Reagan had three motivations. First, he agreed with the neoconservatives who argued that the Soviets had pulled ahead in military power and the U.S. had to race to catch up. Stansfield Turner, CIA director under Carter, warned in 1981 that, "in the last several years all of the best studies have shown that the balance of strategic nuclear capabilities has been tipping in favor of the Soviet Union." Second, Reagan believed the decrepit Soviet economy could not handle a high-tech weapons race based on computers; it was imperative to block them from gaining western technology.

Third, was the moral certainty that Communism was evil and doomed to failure. Reagan was the first major world leader to declare that Communism would soon collapse. On March 3, 1983, he was blunt to a religious group: the Soviet Union is "the focus of evil in the modern world" and could not last: "I believe that communism is another sad, bizarre chapter in human history whose — last pages even now are being written." His most detailed analysis came on June 8, 1982, to the British Parliament, stunning the Soviets and allies alike. Most experts assumed that the Soviet Union would be around for generations to come, and it was essential to recognize that and work with them. But Reagan labeled the USSR an "evil empire" and argued that it was suffering a deep economic crisis, which he intended to make worse by cutting off western technology. He stated the Soviet Union "runs against the tide of history by denying human freedom and human dignity to its citizens."

A year later in 1983, Reagan introduced the Strategic Defense Initiative (SDI), labeled "Star Wars" by the media, after the 1977 film of the same name. Reagan, following the ideas of Edward Teller (who invented the hydrogen bomb in 1950) called for a defensive missile umbrella over the U.S. that would intercept and destroy in space any hostile missiles. It was an unexpected, new idea, and supporters cheered, as SDI seemed to promise protection from nuclear war. To opponents, SDI meant a new arms race and the end of the Mutual Assured Destruction ("MAD") strategy that they believed had so far prevented nuclear war. The Soviets lacked basic computers, and were unable to say whether it would work or not. Critics said it would cost a trillion dollars; supporters said the Soviets would go bankrupt if they tried to match it. The SDI was funded but was never operational.

=== Defense spending ===
The Reagan administration made dramatic increases in defense spending one of their three main priorities upon taking office. The transition to the new professional all-professional force was finalized, and the draft forgot. A dramatic expansion of salary bases and benefits for both enlisted and officers made career service much more attractive. Under the aggressive leadership of Defense Secretary Caspar Weinberger, the development of the B-1 bomber was reinstated, and there was funding for a new B-2 bomber, as well as cruise missiles, the MX missile, and a 600 ship Navy. The new weaponry was designed with Soviet targets in mind. In terms of real dollars after taxation, defense spending jumped 34 percent between 1981 in 1985. In Reagan's two terms, defense spending totaled about 2 trillion dollars, but even so, it was a lower percentage of the federal budget, or GDP, than before 1976. There were arms sales to build up allies as well. The most notable came in 1981, an $8.5 billion sale to Saudi Arabia involving aircraft, tanks, and Airborne Warning and Control Systems (AWACS). Israel protested since the AWACS would undermine its strategic attack capabilities. To mollify Israel and its powerful lobby in Washington, the United States promised to supply it with an additional F-15 squadron, a $600 million loan, and permission to export Israeli-made Kfir fighting aircraft to Latin American armies.

In its first term administration looked at arms control measures with deep suspicion. However, after the massive buildup, and the second term it looked at them with favor and achieve major arms reductions with Mikhail Gorbachev.

=== Nuclear weapons ===
According to several scholars and Reagan biographers, including, John Lewis Gaddis, Richard Reeves, Lou Cannon and Reagan himself in his autobiography, Reagan earnestly desired the abolition of all nuclear weapons. He proposed to Mikhail Gorbachev that if a missile shield could be built, all nuclear weapons are eliminated and the missile shield technology shared, the world would be much better off. Paul Lettow has argued that Reagan's opposition to nuclear weapons started at the dawn of the nuclear age and in December 1945 he was only prevented from leading an anti-nuclear rally in Hollywood by pressure from the Warner Brothers studio.

Reagan believed the mutually assured destruction policy formulated in the 1950s to be morally wrong. In his autobiography, Reagan wrote:

The Pentagon said at least 150 million American lives would be lost in a nuclear war with the Soviet Union—even if we 'won.' For Americans who survived such a war, I couldn't imagine what life would be like. The planet would be so poisoned the 'survivors' would have no place to live. Even if a nuclear war did not mean the extinction of mankind, it would certainly mean the end of civilization as we knew it. No one could 'win' a nuclear war. Yet as long as nuclear weapons were in existence, there would always be risks they would be used, and once the first nuclear weapon was unleashed, who knew where it would end? My dream, then, became a world free of nuclear weapons. ... For the eight years I was president I never let my dream of a nuclear-free world fade from my mind.

Reagan and Gorbachev signed the Intermediate-Range Nuclear Forces Treaty in 1987 (and ratified in 1988), which was the first in Cold War history to mandate the destruction of an entire class of nuclear weapons.

=== Iran-Iraq ===
Originally neutral in the Iran–Iraq War of 1980 to 1988, the Reagan administration began supporting Iraq because an Iranian victory would not serve the interests of the United States. In 1983, Reagan issued a National Security Decision Directive memo which called for heightened regional military cooperation to defend oil facilities, measures to improve U.S. military capabilities in the Persian Gulf, directed the secretaries of state and defense and the chairman of the Joint Chiefs of Staff to take appropriate measures to respond to tensions in the area.

== Economic policy ==
=== Economic plans, taxes and deficit ===
Reagan believed in policies based on supply-side economics and advocated a laissez-faire philosophy, seeking to stimulate the economy with large, across-the-board tax cuts. Reagan pointed to improvements in certain key economic indicators as evidence of success. The policies proposed that economic growth would occur when marginal tax rates were low enough to spur investment, which would then lead to increased economic growth, higher employment, and wages.

Reagan did not believe in raising income taxes. During his presidential tenure, the top federal income tax rates were lowered from 70% to 28%. However, it has also been acknowledged that Reagan did raise taxes on eleven occasions during his presidency to both preserve his defense agenda and combat the growing national debt and budget deficit.

It was reported in 1982 that Reagan was proposing a tax on benefits to discourage unemployed citizens from seeking them, but the idea was abandoned.

To cover the growing federal budget deficits and the decreased revenue that resulted from the cuts, the U.S. borrowed heavily both domestically and abroad, raising the national debt from $1.1 trillion to $2.7 trillion. Reagan described the new debt as the "greatest disappointment" of his presidency.

Reagan's economic tax plans had early been labeled "voodoo economics" and "trickle down economics", both terms of which have propelled far into the US political discourse since, and are still used today alongside Reagan's name. George H. W. Bush infamously levied the charge that Reagan's tax plan was "voodoo" while running against him in the 1980 republican primary. Reagan's former budget director, championed Reagan's tax cuts at first, but only a few years later sided with liberal critics that "supply-side economics" is "trickle-down" Political opponents of the Reagan administration soon seized on this language to brand the administration as caring only about the wealthy.

=== Free trade ===
Reagan was a supporter of free trade. When running for President in 1979, Reagan proposed a "North American accord", in which goods could move freely throughout the U.S., Canada, and Mexico. Largely dismissed then, Reagan was serious in his proposal and once in office he signed an agreement with Canada to that effect. His "North American accord" later became the official North American Free Trade Agreement (NAFTA), signed by President George H. W. Bush and ratified by President Bill Clinton.

Reagan understood free trade as including the use of tariffs to protect American jobs and industry against foreign competition. He imposed a temporary 100% tariff on Japanese electronics as well as other tariffs on a variety of industrial products, which resulted in some free market advocates criticizing his policies as protectionist in practice.

=== Healthcare ===
Reagan was opposed to socialized healthcare, universal health care, or publicly funded health care. In 1961, while still a member of the Democratic Party, Reagan voiced his opposition to single-payer healthcare in an 11-minute recording. The idea was beginning to be advocated by the Democratic Party. In it, Reagan stated:

One of the traditional methods of imposing statism or socialism on a people has been by way of medicine. It is very easy to describe a medical program as a humanitarian project ... Under the Truman administration, it was proposed that we have a compulsory health insurance program for all people in the United States, and of course, the American people unhesitatingly rejected this ... In the last decade, 127 million of our citizens, in just ten years, have come under the protection of some privately-owned medical or hospital insurance. The advocates of [socialized healthcare], when you try to oppose it, challenge you on an emotional basis ... What can we do about this? Well, you and I can do a great deal. We can write to our [ Congressmen, to our Senators. We can say right now that we want no further encroachment on these individual liberties and freedoms. And at the moment, the key issue is we do not want socialized medicine ... If you don't, this program I promise you will pass just as surely as the sun will come up tomorrow. And behind it will come other federal programs that will invade every area of freedom as well as have known it in this country, until one day, as Norman Thomas said, we will awake to find that we have socialism. If you don't do this and if I don't do it, one of these days you and I are going to spend our sunset years telling our children, and our children's children, what it once was like in America when men were free.

=== Minimum wage ===
In 1983, Reagan stated the minimum wage, which was $3.35 per hour at the time, should not apply to young people, with his reasoning being that the unemployment rate goes higher when the hourly rate is raised.

=== Social Security ===
Reagan was in favor of making Social Security benefits voluntary. According to Reagan biographer Lou Cannon: "I do not doubt that he shared the view that Social Security was a Ponzi scheme. He was intrigued by the idea of a voluntary plan that would have allowed workers to make their investments. This idea would have undermined the system by depriving Social Security of the contributions of millions of the nation's highest-paid workers".

Although Reagan was for a limited government and against the idea of a welfare state, he continued to fully fund Social Security and Medicare because the elderly were dependent on those programs.

Mounting concerns that rising Social Security benefits were causing a long-term deficit and were growing too fast resulted in a bipartisan compromise in 1983. Brokered by conservative Alan Greenspan and liberal Congressman Claude Pepper, the agreement lowered benefits over the next 75 years and brought the system into balance. Key provisions included a gradual increase over 25 years in the retirement age from 65 to 67, to take account of longer life expectancy. (People could retire younger but at a reduced rate of benefits.) Millions of people were added to the system, especially employees of state governments and nonprofit organizations.

=== New Deal ===
Reagan wrote that he never tried to undo the New Deal because he admired President Franklin D. Roosevelt and voted for him in each of his four presidential campaigns. Reagan repeatedly said that many New Deal advisers to Roosevelt espoused fascism.

=== Welfare ===
In 1986, Reagan stated the welfare system in America was "misguided" with his reasoning being that it has made the issue of poverty worse.

=== Energy and oil ===
As President, Reagan removed controls on oil prices, resulting in lower prices and an oil glut. He did not reduce U.S. dependency on oil by imposing an oil-importing fee because of his opposition to taxation. He trusted the free marketplace. Lower global oil prices had the effect of reducing the income that the Soviet Union could earn from its oil exports.

== Social policy ==
=== Environment ===
In 1980, Reagan lamented regulations on air pollution. In 1981, Reagan pledged to abolish the United States Department of Energy. Reagan dismissed acid rain and proposals to halt it as burdensome to industry. In the early 1980s, pollution had become an issue in Canada, and Prime Minister Pierre Trudeau objected to the pollution originating in U.S. factory smokestacks in the midwest. The Environmental Protection Agency implored Reagan to make a major budget commitment to reduce acid rain, but Reagan rejected the proposal and deemed it as wasteful government spending. He questioned scientific evidence on the causes of acid rain.

In 1982, Reagan proposed selling federal land as a way to reduce the deficit.

=== Abortion ===
Although, as Governor of California, Reagan signed into law the Therapeutic Abortion Act in May 1967, a bill allowing abortion, he later stated his regret in which he was left with a sense of guilt He was quoted as saying: "If there is a question as to whether there is life or death, the doubt should be resolved in favor of life". In 1982, he stated: "Simple morality dictates that unless and until someone can prove the unborn human is not alive, we must give it the benefit of the doubt and assume it is (alive). And, thus, it should be entitled to life, liberty, and the pursuit of happiness".

As Governor of California, Reagan signed into law the Therapeutic Abortion Act in May 1967 to reduce the number of "back-room abortions" performed in California. It was one of the most liberal abortion laws in the country and allowed for pregnancy terminations if the mother was in physical or mental distress as a result, or if the pregnancy was a product of rape or incest. As a result, approximately one million abortions would be performed and Reagan blamed this on doctors, arguing that they had deliberately misinterpreted the law. Just when the law was signed, Reagan stated that had he been more experienced as Governor, he would not have signed it. Reagan then declared himself to be opposed to abortion rights.

As president, he continued to state his stance against abortion, such as in 1983, when he endorsed a bill in Congress that was introduced by Henry Hyde that would prohibit federal funds for abortion.

In 1985, he took the side of pro-lifers over the conclusion of a legal case regarding aborted fetuses in California.

In one way, he played a role in protecting legalized abortion after he left office. His first judicial appointee for the Supreme Court, Sandra Day O’Connor, led the effort to uphold Roe v. Wade in a 1992 case over restrictive abortion laws in Pennsylvania.

=== Abstinence ===
In 1987, Reagan stated that abstinence should be a method to avoid getting the AIDS virus.

=== Crime and capital punishment ===
Reagan was a supporter of capital punishment. As California's Governor, Reagan was beseeched to grant executive clemency to Aaron Mitchell, who had been sentenced to death for the murder of a Sacramento police officer, but he refused. Mitchell was executed the following morning. It was the only execution during his eight years as Governor—he had previously granted executive clemency to one man on death row who had a history of brain damage. He also stayed the execution of convicted murderer Robert Lee Massie in 1967 because he wanted Massie to attend the trial of his alleged accomplice. Massie would be executed over three decades later for a separate murder in 2001.

He approved the construction of three new prisons as President in 1982 as recommended by Attorney General William French Smith.

=== Drugs ===
Reagan firmly sought opposition to illegal drugs. He and his wife sought to reduce the use of illegal drugs through the Just Say No Drug Awareness campaign, an organization Nancy Reagan founded as first lady. In a 1986 address to the nation by Ronald and Nancy Reagan, the President said: "[W]hile drug and alcohol abuse cuts across all generations, it's especially damaging to the young people on whom our future depends ... Drugs are menacing our society. They're threatening our values and undercutting our institutions. They're killing our children."

Reagan also reacted to illegal drugs outside Just Say No as the Federal Bureau Investigation added five hundred drug enforcement agents, began record drug crackdowns nationwide and established thirteen regional anti-drug task forces under Reagan. In the address with the first lady, President Reagan reported on the progress of his administration, saying:

Thirty-seven Federal agencies are working together in a vigorous national effort, and by next year our spending for drug law enforcement will have more than tripled from its 1981 levels. We have increased seizures of illegal drugs. Shortages of marijuana are now being reported. Last year alone over 10,000 drug criminals were convicted and nearly $250 million of their assets were seized by the DEA, the Drug Enforcement Administration. And in the most important area, individual use, we see progress. In 4 years the number of high school seniors using marijuana daily has dropped from 1 in 14 to 1 in 20. The U.S. military has cut the use of illegal drugs among its personnel by 67 percent since 1980. These are a measure of our commitment and emerging signs that we can defeat this enemy.

=== Immigration ===
The Immigration Reform and Control Act of 1986 was signed into law by Reagan on November 6, 1986. The act legalized most undocumented immigrants who had arrived in the country before January 1, 1982.

Reagan did not make immigration a major focus of his administration. However, he came to support the package of reforms sponsored by Republican Senator Alan Simpson and Democratic Congressman Romano Mazzoli and signed the Immigration Reform and Control Act into law in November 1986. Upon signing the act at a ceremony held beside the newly-refurbished Statue of Liberty, Reagan said, "The legalization provisions in this act will go far to improve the lives of a class of individuals who now must hide in the shadows, without access to many of the benefits of a free and open society. Very soon many of these men and women will be able to step into the sunlight and, ultimately, if they choose, they may become Americans."

In 1986, Reagan signed the Emergency Medical Treatment and Active Labor Act (EMTALA), which forbade hospitals from denying emergency care services based on immigration status.

=== Gun control ===
Despite being a member of the National Rifle Association of America (NRA) and carrying a pistol for self-defense, Reagan supported gun control measures. As Governor of California, he signed the Mulford Act of 1967 in retaliation to the Black Panther Party protesting with guns on the steps of the California state house. The bill prohibited the open carrying of firearms and banned loaded firearms in the state capital. After the Panthers' demonstration, Reagan commented that he saw "no reason why on the street today a citizen should be carrying loaded weapons" and that he thought that guns were a "ridiculous way to solve problems that have to be solved among people of goodwill."

In 1986, Reagan signed into law the Firearm Owners Protection Act, which banned the sale of fully automatic weapons to civilians.

At his 78th birthday celebration in 1989, Reagan condemned private ownership and use of machine guns, stating, ″I do not believe in taking away the right of the citizen [to bear arms] for sporting, for hunting and so forth, or for home defense, ... But I do believe that an AK-47, a machine gun, is not a sporting weapon or needed for the defense of a home.″

During the Bill Clinton administration, Reagan publicly endorsed the Brady bill and the Federal Assault Weapons Ban of 1994.

=== No-fault divorce ===
California was the first U.S. state to enact a no-fault divorce law. The law was signed by Reagan and came into effect in 1970.

=== Women ===
While running for President, Reagan pledged that if given the chance, he would appoint a woman to the U.S. Supreme Court. In 1981, he appointed Sandra Day O'Connor as the first female justice of the Supreme Court. As President, Reagan opposed the Equal Rights Amendment (ERA) because he thought that women were already protected by the 14th Amendment, although he had supported the amendment and offered to help women's groups achieve its ratification while serving as Governor of California. Reagan pulled his support for the ERA shortly before announcing his 1976 candidacy for President. The 1976 Republican National Convention renewed the party's support for the amendment, but in 1980 the party qualified its 40-year support for ERA. Despite opposing the ERA, Reagan did not actively work against the amendment, which his daughter Maureen (who advised her father on various issues including women's rights) and most prominent Republicans supported.

Reagan established a "Fifty States Project" and councils and commissions on women designed to find existing statutes at the federal and state levels and eradicate them, the latter through a liaison with the various state governors. Elizabeth Dole, a Republican feminist and former Federal Trade Commissioner and advisor to Presidents Lyndon B. Johnson, Richard Nixon and Gerald Ford (who would go on to become Reagan's Transportation Secretary) headed up his women's rights project.

=== Black people ===
Reagan dismissed all attacks related to racism that were aimed at him as attacks on his character and attacks on his integrity.

Reagan opposed racial segregation.

On the federal level, Reagan opposed many civil rights bills throughout the years of his administration.

He had initially opposed the Civil Rights Act of 1964 on the grounds that specific provisions of the law infringed upon the individual's right to private property and to do business with whomever they chose, and the Voting Rights Act of 1965 on constitutional grounds, but some have speculated that his position involved "an element of political calculation".

By 1965 however, Reagan switched positions and stated that he favors the Civil Rights Act of 1964 and that "it must be enforced at gunpoint, if necessary". In 1980, Reagan said the Voting Rights Act of 1965 was "humiliating to the South", but in 1982 he signed a bill extending it for 25 years after a grass-roots lobbying and legislative campaign forced him to abandon his plan to ease that law's restrictions. In 1988, he vetoed the Civil Rights Restoration Act, but his veto was overridden by Congress. This was especially notable as it was the first Civil Rights bill to be both vetoed and to be overridden since President Andrew Johnson vetoed the Civil Rights Act of 1866 followed by Congress overriding the veto and making it law. Reagan had argued that the legislation infringed on states' rights and the rights of churches and small business owners. Reagan's Equal Employment Opportunity Commission, as well as his Justice Department, prosecuted fewer civil rights cases per year than they had under his predecessor, President Jimmy Carter.

In 1967, Reagan signed the Mulford Act into law which banned the carrying of loaded weapons in public in the state of California. While California was an open-carry state, when the Black Panther Party began lawfully open-carrying and monitoring law enforcement for police brutality, bipartisan calls for increased gun control came from the California State Legislature. The law was controversial, as it was retaliatory against the Black Panthers, but Reagan defended the law, saying that he saw "no reason why on the street today a citizen should be carrying loaded weapons".

Critics have claimed that Reagan gave his 1980 presidential campaign speech about states' rights in Philadelphia, Mississippi in a calculated attempt to appeal to racist southern voters. This location is near the place where three civil rights workers were killed in 1964. However, supporters have pointed out that Reagan had given it at the Neshoba County Fair a few miles away from where the murders took place. They also said that the vast majority of his speech had nothing to do with "states' rights" and that the fair was a popular campaigning spot. Presidential candidates John Glenn and Michael Dukakis both campaigned there as well years later. While campaigning in Georgia, Reagan mentioned Confederate President Jefferson Davis as an example of someone who used the line-item veto, which Reagan supported. However, Reagan was offended that some accused him of racism.

Reagan initially opposed Fair Housing legislation in California (specifically the Rumford Fair Housing Act), however in 1988 he signed a law expanding the Fair Housing Act of 1968. While signing the expanding of the Fair Housing Act of 1968, he said, among other things, that "[the bill was a] step closer to realizing Martin Luther King's dream", "[the bill was the] most important civil rights legislation in 20 years", and "[the passage of the Civil Rights of 1968 bill] was a major achievement, one that many members of Congress, including a young Congressman named George Bush, had to show enormous courage to vote for". Congressman John Lewis stated that Reagan "dramatized in a very open fashion that he is supportive of efforts to end discrimination in housing" and that Reagan's statements were blatantly meant for political gain as it was an election year. Reagan had previously stated in 1966 that, "If an individual wants to discriminate against Negroes or others in selling or renting his house, he has a right to do so [...] even though such prejudice is morally wrong." Nevertheless, Reagan supported the statute which prohibits racial discrimination on public accommodations and facilities, promised that he would use the "power and prestige" of the governor's office to ensure civil rights for everyone and sought to put an end to "the cancer of racial discrimination".

Reagan engaged in a policy of Constructive engagement with South Africa despite apartheid due to the nation being a valuable anti-communist ally. He opposed pressure from Congress and his party for tougher sanctions until his veto was overridden. South African Archbishop and anti-apartheid activist Desmond Tutu called Reagan's policy as "immoral, evil, and un-Christian" as Nazism and lamented that the president's administration was overall "an unmitigated disaster" for black people.

Reagan opposed the Martin Luther King holiday at first, despite noting that King should be honored for freeing the United States from "the burden of racism", however, he accepted and signed it after an overwhelming veto-proof majority (338 to 90 in the House of Representatives and 78 to 22 in the Senate) voted in favor of it.

In July 2019, newly unearthed tapes were released of a 1971 phone call between Reagan, then Governor of California, and President Richard Nixon. Angered by African delegates at the United Nations siding against the U.S. in the vote to expel Taiwan from the UN and recognize the People's Republic of China, Reagan stated, "To see those, those monkeys from those African countries - damn them, they're still uncomfortable wearing shoes!" Reagan's son-in-law, Dennis C. Revell, responded that Reagan's remarks reflected the attitudes of his era and that some African nations had only recently gained independence from European countries when Reagan spoke with Nixon. Revell also noted that Reagan enjoyed a great relationship with his oldest daughter’s adopted girl from Uganda and also with several African politicians, such as Samora Machel and Yoweri Museveni.

=== LGBT rights ===
Reagan publicly opposed the 1978 California Proposition 6, which sought to ban gays and lesbians from working in California's public schools. He issued an informal letter of opposition to the initiative, answered reporters' questions about the initiative by saying he was against it, and, a week before the election, wrote an editorial in the Los Angeles Herald-Examiner opposing it. According to a 2004 IGF Culture Watch article by Dale Carpenter:

Cannon reports that Reagan was "repelled by the aggressive public crusades against homosexual life styles which became a staple of right wing politics in the late 1970s." ... The timing is significant because he was then preparing to run for president, a race in which he would need the support of conservatives and moderates very uncomfortable with homosexual teachers. As Cannon puts it, Reagan was "well aware that there were those who wanted him to duck the issue" but nevertheless "chose to state his convictions."

In 2021, John Kenneth White of The Hill opined:

1978 was an important year for Reagan. Having experienced a narrow loss to Gerald Ford at the Republican National Convention just two years before, Reagan was beginning to embark on another quest for the presidency. Evangelicals were beginning their journey into the Republican party, and Reagan was actively courting religious leaders like Falwell who, in 1979, would form the Moral Majority. But in 1978, Reagan took an enormous political risk by coming out strongly against the Briggs Initiative. In a powerful statement, the former California governor denounced the measure saying, "[I]t has the potential of infringing on the basic rights of privacy and even constitutional rights." Reagan noted the "undue harm" it could cause, adding: "Whatever it is, homosexuality is not a disease like the measles. Prevailing scientific opinion is that an individual’s sexuality is determined at a very early age and that a child’s teachers do not really influence this."

In 1984, Reagan stood by his position against gay marriage by stating:

Society has always regarded marital love as a sacred expression of the bond between a man and a woman. It is the means by which families are created and society itself is extended into the future. In the Judeo-Christian tradition it is the means by which husband and wife participate with God in the creation of a new human life. It is for these reasons, among others, that our society has always sought to protect this unique relationship. In part the erosion of these values has given way to a celebration of forms of expression most reject. We will resist the efforts of some to obtain government endorsement of homosexuality.

== Education ==
=== School prayer ===
Reagan was a supporter of prayer in U.S. schools, as in 1982, he sent Congress a proposed constitutional amendment to allow it, but stating it wouldn't be mandatory.

On February 25, 1984, in his weekly radio address, he said: "Sometimes I can't help but feel the first amendment is being turned on its head. Because ask yourselves: Can it be true that the first amendment can permit Nazis and Ku Klux Klansmen to march on public property, advocate the extermination of people of the Jewish faith, and the subjugation of blacks, while the same amendment forbids our children from saying a prayer in school?".

The next month, it was reported the Reagan was pressuring Senators to pass legislation regarding prayer in schools.

By 1988, Reagan largely stopped talking about school prayer.

Reagan was particularly opposed to the establishment of the Department of Education, which had occurred under his predecessor, President Jimmy Carter. This view stemmed from his anti-government intervention views. He had pledged to abolish the department, but did not pursue that goal as President.

=== Student Loans ===
In 1985, Reagan proposed student loan cuts for students from families earning above a certain income level.

== Works cited and further reading ==
- Appleby, Joyce; Alan Brinkley; James M. McPherson (2003). The American Journey. Woodland Hills, California: Glencoe/McGraw-Hill. ISBN 978-0-07-824129-1.
- Bell, Coral. The Reagan Paradox: U.S. Foreign Policy in the 1980s (1989) short overview by Australian scholar excerpt Archived March 10, 2019, at the Wayback Machine
- Beschloss, Michael (2007). Presidential Courage: Brave Leaders and How they Changed America 1789–1989. Simon & Schuster. ISBN 9780684857053.
- Brands, H.W. Reagan: The Life (2015), scholarly biography; 810pp
- Busch, Andrew E.; "Ronald Reagan and the Defeat of the Soviet Empire" in Presidential Studies Quarterly. 27#3 (1997). pp. 451+
- Cannon, Lou (2000). President Reagan: The Role of a Lifetime. New York: Public Affairs. ISBN 978-1-891620-91-1.; scholarly biography, 953pp
- Gaddis, John Lewis (2005). The Cold War: A New History. The Penguin Press. ISBN 9781594200625.
- Hayward, Steven F. The Age of Reagan: The Conservative Counterrevolution: 1980–1989 (2009), strongly pro-Reagan
- Johns, Andrew L., ed. A Companion to Ronald Reagan (Wiley-Blackwell, 2015). xiv, 682 pp.; topical essays by scholars emphasizing historiography; contents free at many libraries Archived December 23, 2017, at the Wayback Machine
- Kyvig, David. ed. Reagan and the World (1990), scholarly essays on foreign policy.
- Pemberton, William E. (1998). Exit With Honor: The Life and Presidency of Ronald Reagan. M.E. Sharpe. ISBN 978-0-7656-0096-7.
- Reagan, Ronald (1990). An American Life. New York: Simon & Schuster. ISBN 978-0-7434-0025-1., autobiography; primary source
- Reeves, Richard (2005). President Reagan: The Triumph of Imagination. New York: Simon & Schuster. ISBN 978-0-7432-3022-3.
- Schmertz, Eric J., et al. eds. Ronald Reagan and the World (1997) articles by scholars and officeholders online edition Archived October 13, 2008, at the Wayback Machine
- Troy, Gil (2009). The Reagan Revolution: A Very Short Introduction. Oxford University Press.
