= National Register of Historic Places listings in Neshoba County, Mississippi =

Location of Neshoba County in Mississippi

This is a list of the National Register of Historic Places listings in Neshoba County, Mississippi.

This is intended to be a complete list of the properties and districts on the National Register of Historic Places in Neshoba County, Mississippi, United States. Latitude and longitude coordinates are provided for many National Register properties and districts; these locations may be seen together in a map.

There are 7 properties and districts listed on the National Register in the county.

This National Park Service list is complete through NPS recent listings posted March 14, 2025.

== Current listings ==
	Name on the Register	Image	Date listed	Location	City or town	Description
1	Downtown Philadelphia Historic District	Downtown Philadelphia Historic District	April 14, 2005 (#05000280)	Roughly bounded by Myrtle, Peachtree, Walnut, and Pecan; 32°46′17″N 89°06′36″W	Philadelphia	
2	Mt. Zion Methodist Church	Mt. Zion Methodist Church	July 13, 2018 (#100001029)	11191 Cty. Rd. 747; 32°46′54″N 88°59′30″W	Philadelphia	
3	Nanih Waiya Cave Mound	Nanih Waiya Cave Mound	May 7, 1973 (#73001023)	Address restricted	Philadelphia	
4	Neshoba County Fair Historic District	Neshoba County Fair Historic District	April 22, 1980 (#80002294)	Northwest of Neshoba on Mississippi Highway 21; 32°42′49″N 89°12′47″W	Neshoba	Entrance into the Neshoba County Fairgrounds
5	Philadelphia Historic District	Philadelphia Historic District	March 4, 1983 (#83000964)	Holland and Poplar Aves. and Jefferson, Watkins, and Welsh Sts. 32°46′07″N 89°06′24″W	Philadelphia	
6	Old US Post Office (Philadelphia)	Old US Post Office (Philadelphia)	June 30, 1995 (#95000788)	523 Main Street; 32°46′14″N 89°06′32″W	Philadelphia	Constructed 1935-36, serves as Philadelphia Police Station
7	Booker T. Washington High School	Booker T. Washington High School	September 2, 2021 (#100006878)	234 Carver Ave. 32°46′45″N 89°07′04″W	Philadelphia	

== See also ==
- List of National Historic Landmarks in Mississippi
- National Register of Historic Places listings in Mississippi
