= Earl S. Richardson (politician) =

American lawyer and politician (1879–1973)

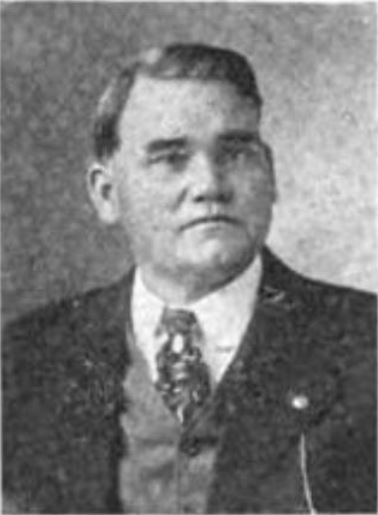
- c. 1917

Member of the Mississippi State Senate from the 17th district 19th (1916-1920, 1932-1936)
- In office January 1940 – September 2, 1943
- In office January 1932 – January 1936
- In office January 1916 – January 1920

Member of the Mississippi House of Representatives from the Neshoba County district
- In office January 1936 – January 1940

Personal details
- Born: May 29, 1879 Neshoba County, MS
- Died: September 2, 1943 (aged 64) Philadelphia, Mississippi

Earl Stribling Richardson (May 29, 1879 - September 2, 1943) was a Democratic Mississippi lawyer and politician from Neshoba County. He represented the state's 19th district in the Mississippi State Senate from 1916 to 1920 and from 1932 to 1936, and the 17th district from 1940 to his death in 1943. He also represented Neshoba County in the Mississippi House of Representatives from 1936 to 1940.

== Biography ==
Earl Stribling Richardson was born on May 29, 1879, in Hope, Neshoba County, Mississippi. He was the son of William Wescott Richardson and Nancy Kenchelo (Stribling) Richardson. William, originally from Belmont, Alabama, was one of the founders of the Neshoba County Fair. Earl attended the public schools of Neshoba County and graduated from Waldo High School. He then attended the Millsaps College, graduating in the Law Class of 1902 and 1903. He began practicing law afterwards. He also was the president of the Neshoba County Fair for ten years, until before 1916.

== Political career ==
Richardson was the City Attorney of Philadelphia, Mississippi, from 1910 to 1912. He was elected to represent Mississippi's 19th senatorial district in the Mississippi Senate as a Democrat in 1915 for the 1916–1920 term. He then represented the same district in the Senate from 1932 to 1936. In 1935, he was elected to represent Neshoba County in the Mississippi House of Representatives for the 1936–1940 term. In 1939, he was elected to represent Mississippi's 17th senatorial district (Leake and Neshoba Counties) in the Mississippi Senate, for the 1940–1944 term. However, he died suddenly in his home in Philadelphia, Mississippi, on September 2, 1943, before his term ended. Before he died, he was nominated without opposition to represent Neshoba county in the Mississippi House for the 1944–1948 term.
