= V. C. Manning =

American educator and politician (1947–2026)

Member of the Mississippi House of Representatives from the 44th district
- In office January 2, 1996 – January 4, 2000
- Preceded by: Mike Eakes
- Succeeded by: Mike Eakes

Member of the Mississippi Senate from the 18th district
- In office January 3, 1984 – January 5, 1988
- Preceded by: Charles Pittman
- Succeeded by: Terry L. Jordan

Personal details
- Born: December 23, 1947 Neshoba County, Mississippi, U.S.
- Died: August 21, 2026 (aged 78)
- Party: Democratic
- Spouse: Denise Davis (divorced 2014) Deirdre Amis Maxie (married 2014)
- Education: University of Southern Mississippi; Mississippi State University

Vennis C. Manning (December 23, 1947 – August 21, 2026) was an American educator and politician. A member of the Democratic Party, he served in the Mississippi State Senate from 1984 to 1988 and the Mississippi House of Representatives from 1996 to 2000. Manning did on August 21, 2026, at the age of 78.
