= Neshoba, Mississippi =

- Unincorporated community
- Location within Mississippi Location within the United States
- Coordinates: 32°37′24″N 89°08′17″W
- Country: United States
- State: Mississippi
- County: Neshoba
- Elevation: 499 ft (152 m)
- Time zone: UTC-6 (Central (CST))
  - Summer (DST): UTC-5 (CDT)
- ZIP code: 39350
- Area code: 601
- GNIS feature ID: 674558

Neshoba is an unincorporated community located in Neshoba County, Mississippi, United States. Neshoba is approximately 5.3 miles (8.5 km) north of Union along Mississippi Highway 15.

The community takes its name from the county in which it is located.

Neshoba is located on the former Gulf, Mobile and Ohio Railroad and had a railroad depot from 1907 to 1933. The community was incorporated on November 27, 1906 and disincorporated at a later date. In 1910, the community had six general stores, a millinery, furniture store, wagon store, machine shop, and hardware store.

In 1971, Neshoba had one of only two operating post offices in the county. It has since closed, leaving only one post office in Philadelphia. During its peak in the early 20th century, the county had as many as 40 small post offices operating at the same time.
