= Burnside, Mississippi =

- Unincorporated community
- Location within Mississippi Location within the United States
- Coordinates: 32°51′12″N 89°06′12″W
- Country: United States
- State: Mississippi
- County: Neshoba
- Elevation: 400 ft (120 m)
- Time zone: UTC-6 (Central (CST))
  - Summer (DST): UTC-5 (CDT)
- ZIP code: 39350
- Area code: 601
- GNIS feature ID: 667823

Burnside is an unincorporated community located in Neshoba County, Mississippi, United States. Burnside is approximately 5.6 miles (9.0 km) north of Philadelphia along Mississippi Highway 15.

== History ==
Burnside is located on the former Gulf, Mobile and Ohio Railroad and was once home to four general stores, a grocery store and two sawmills. The J. M. Griffin Lumber Company, based in Wilmington, Delaware, formerly operated a large mill in Burnside that consisted of a sawmill, planing mill, dry kilns, power plant and 23 miles of railroad. A mill town was also constructed that was home to a school and churches.

The Philadelphia Neshoba County Park Commission operates Burnside Park in Burnside. The park has an auditorium, picnic pavilions, a suspension bridge, and fishing lake.

From 1905 to 1951, a post office operated in Burnside. Three postmasters served the community during that time.

#	Postmaster	Term	Notes
1	Elizabeth Burnside	August 7, 1905 - January 31, 1940	
2	Tom Ben Fryery	January 31, 1940 - October 28, 1940	
3	Mrs. Vera Gordon	October 28, 1940 - September 7, 1951	After the post office ceased operation, the community was served by the post office at Philadelphia.
