= Joe H. Mulholland =

American politician

- Born: August 26, 1934; Neshoba County, Mississippi, U.S.
- Died: October 16, 2014 (aged 80); Meridian, Mississippi, U.S.
- Resting place: Mars Hill Cemetery, Neshoba County, Mississippi, U.S.
- Education: Mississippi State University (BA); Mississippi College School of Law (JD)
- Occupations: Businessman, politician
- Known for: Mississippi State Senator (1964–1968, 1976–1984)
- Parent(s): Roy and Gladys Mulholland

Joe H. Mulholland (August 26, 1934 – October 16, 2014) was an American businessman and politician.

Born to Roy and Gladys Mulholland in Neshoba County, Mississippi, Joe H. Mulholland received his bachelor's degree from Mississippi State University and his Juris Doctor degree from Mississippi College School of Law. He practiced law in Philadelphia, Mississippi, worked in a bank, and raised cattle. He served in the Mississippi State Senate from 1964 to 1968, and from 1976 to 1984. He died in Meridian, Mississippi of cancer. A member and deacon of Mt. Carmel Church of God, Neshoba County, he was interred in Mars Hill Cemetery.
