= Downtown Philadelphia Historic District (Mississippi) =

Historic district in Mississippi, United States

- U.S. National Register of Historic Places
- U.S. Historic district
- Location: Roughly bounded by Myrtle, Peachtree, Walnut, and Pecan, Philadelphia, Mississippi
- Area: 70 acres (28 ha)
- Architectural style: Classical Revival, Mission/spanish Revival
- NRHP reference No.: 05000280
- Added to NRHP: April 14, 2005

The Downtown Philadelphia Historic District is a designated area within the city limits of Philadelphia, Mississippi in Neshoba County. It was listed in the National Register of Historic Places in 2005, and is loosely bounded by the streets of Myrtle, Peachtree, Walnut, and Pecan. The district features a number of commercial buildings built in the Classical and Mission/Spanish Revival architectural styles.

The nomination form lists 90 buildings and 2 objects. It is adjacent to the Philadelphia Historic District. Some notable buildings in the district include the 1928 Neshoba County Courthouse (Classical Revival), Ellis Theatre (c. 1927), Old Neshoba County Jail (1954), Masonic Temple (c. 1910), and the 1947 First Presbyterian Church (Colonial Revival/Cruciform).
