= Good Hope, Neshoba County, Mississippi =

Good Hope, Mississippi
- Unincorporated community
- Location within Mississippi Location within the United States
- Coordinates: 32°43′40″N 89°09′25″W
- Country: United States
- State: Mississippi
- County: Neshoba
- Elevation: 502 ft (153 m)
- Time zone: UTC-6 (Central (CST))
  - Summer (DST): UTC-5 (CDT)
- Area codes: 601 & 769
- GNIS feature ID: 670462

Good Hope is an unincorporated community in Neshoba County, Mississippi, United States. Good Hope is located at the junction of Mississippi Highway 15 and Mississippi Highway 485 3.8 miles (6.1 km) southwest of Philadelphia.
