= Florence Mars =

American activist

Florence Latimer Mars (January 1, 1923 – April 23, 2006) was an American civil rights activist and author best known for her book Witness in Philadelphia about the murder of three civil rights activists in Mississippi.

== Early life ==
Mars was born on January 1, 1923, in Philadelphia, Mississippi, as the only child of lawyer Adam Longino Mars and Emily Geneva Johnson "Neva" Mars. After having graduated from Philadelphia High School for Girls, Millsaps College, and, in 1944, the University of Mississippi, she worked in Atlanta as a reservations agent for Delta Air Lines. In the 1950s, Mars photographed jazz musicians in her city of residence, New Orleans. She returned to her Philadelphia home in 1962, where spent the rest of her life, raising cattle and owning and running the Neshoba County Stockyards.

== Civil rights activities ==
Mars was one of the few whites in Neshoba County who supported the Civil Rights Movement. She helped to register black voters. Mars lived in Philadelphia, Mississippi, when three civil rights activists James Chaney, Michael Schwerner and Andrew Goodman were beaten and shot by members of the Ku Klux Klan near Philadelphia.

She was one of the few inhabitants to co-operate with the Federal Bureau of Investigation. Edgar Ray Killen and others faced trial for violating the civil rights of the men in 1967 but the jury was deadlocked. Seven men were convicted in relation to the incident but no-one served more than six years. This incident was later the subject of the film Mississippi Burning, which was released in 1988. Frances McDormand's character was partly based on Mars. Mars' activities led to the Ku Klux Klan burning down her barn in an effort to intimidate her.

== Witness in Philadelphia ==
In 1977, she published Witness in Philadelphia which told of her activities in the civil rights movement and the murder of the three activists. This book helped to keep interest alive in the murders with the success of Mississippi Burning making many more people aware of the incident. As a result of this incident, Killen was sentenced to sixty years in prison on June 1, 2005.

== Death ==
Mars died in Philadelphia, Mississippi, aged 83, of congestive heart failure. She had also been suffering from Bell's palsy and diabetes. Mars, having never married, had no immediate survivors.
