= Buck Bounds =

American farmer and politician (1929–2020)

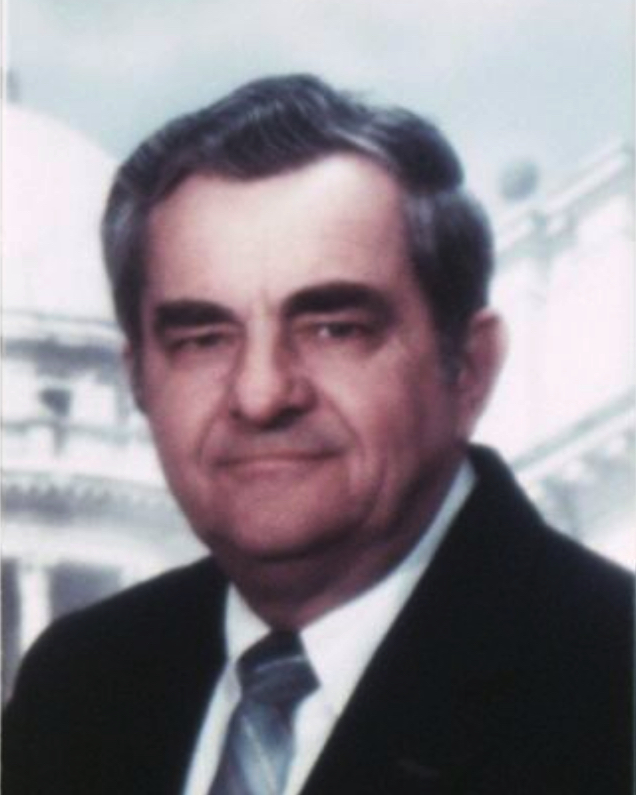

Member of the Mississippi House of Representatives from the 44th district
- In office January 5, 1988 – January 7, 1992
- Preceded by: Mike Eakes
- Succeeded by: Mike Eakes

Personal details
- Born: Shelton Erskine Bounds; June 11, 1929 Philadelphia, Mississippi, U.S.
- Died: January 31, 2020 (aged 90) Philadelphia, Mississippi, U.S.
- Party: Democratic
- Spouse: Barbara Mooney
- Children: 4, including C. Scott Bounds
- Education: East Central Community College; University of Southern Mississippi

Military service
- Allegiance: United States
- Branch/service: United States Air Force
- Battles/wars: Korean War

Shelton Erskine "Buck" Bounds (June 11, 1929 – January 31, 2020) was an American farmer and politician. A member of the Democratic Party, he served two terms on the Philadelphia, Mississippi board of aldermen and one term in the Mississippi House of Representatives. He ran for state senate in 1999 but lost to state Democratic chair Gloria Williamson in the primary. His son, C. Scott Bounds, currently serves in the legislature as a Republican, after he switched parties in 2010.
