= C. Scott Bounds =

American politician (born 1962)

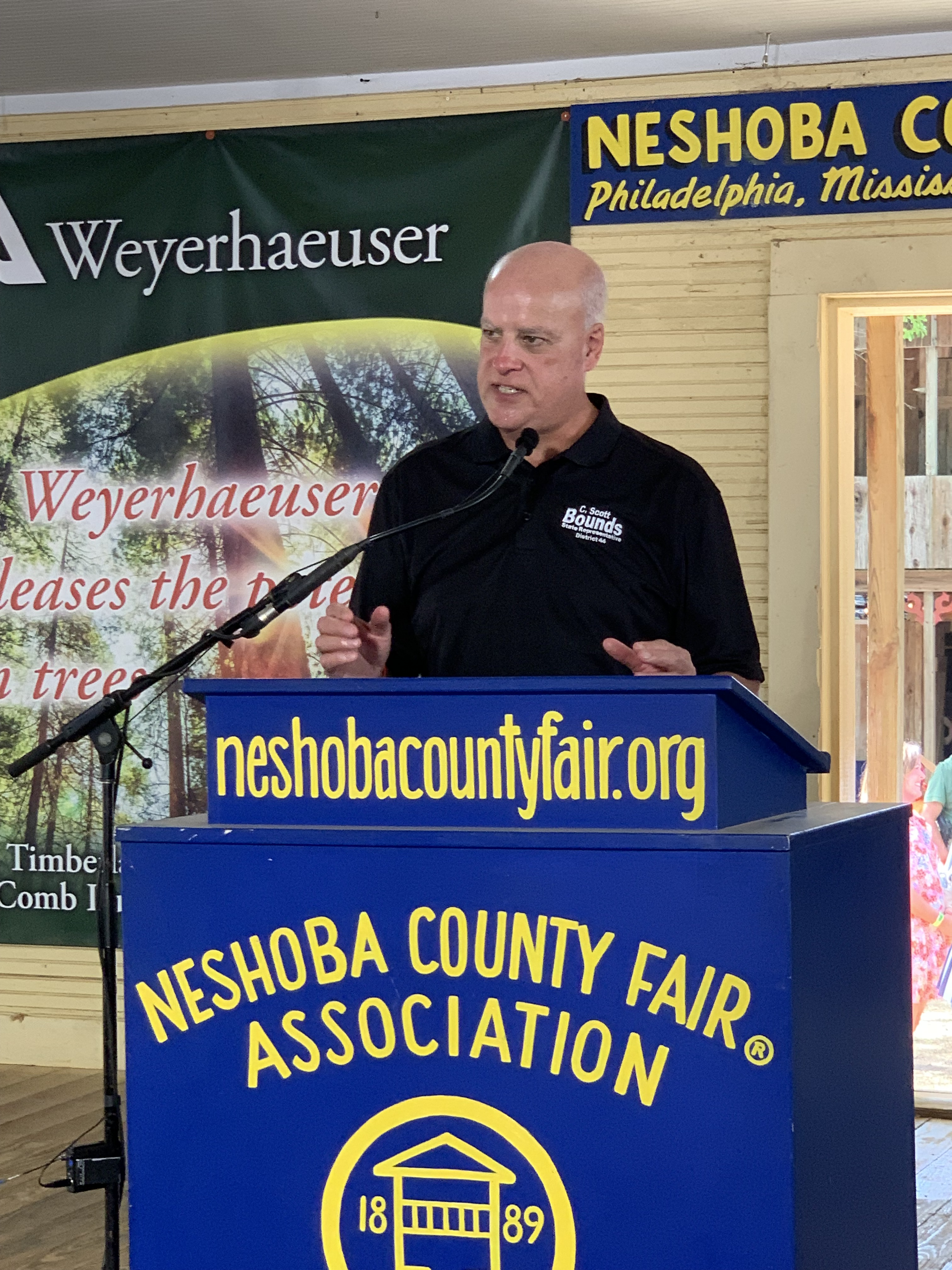

Member of the Mississippi House of Representatives from the 44th district
- Incumbent
- Assumed office January 6, 2004
- Preceded by: Mike Eakes

Personal details
- Born: Craig Scott Bounds; February 12, 1962 (age 64) Philadelphia, Mississippi, U.S.
- Party: Republican (2010–present); Democratic (until 2010)
- Spouse: Jennifer Cheatham
- Education: Mississippi State University

Craig Scott Bounds (born February 12, 1962) is an American politician. He is a Republican member of the Mississippi House of Representatives from the 44th District. He was first elected in 2003 as a Democrat but subsequently switched to Republican affiliation. His father is Democratic politician Buck Bounds.

He resides in his native Philadelphia in Neshoba County in east central Mississippi.
