= Old United States Post Office (Philadelphia, Mississippi) =

- Old U.S. Post Office
- U.S. National Register of Historic Places
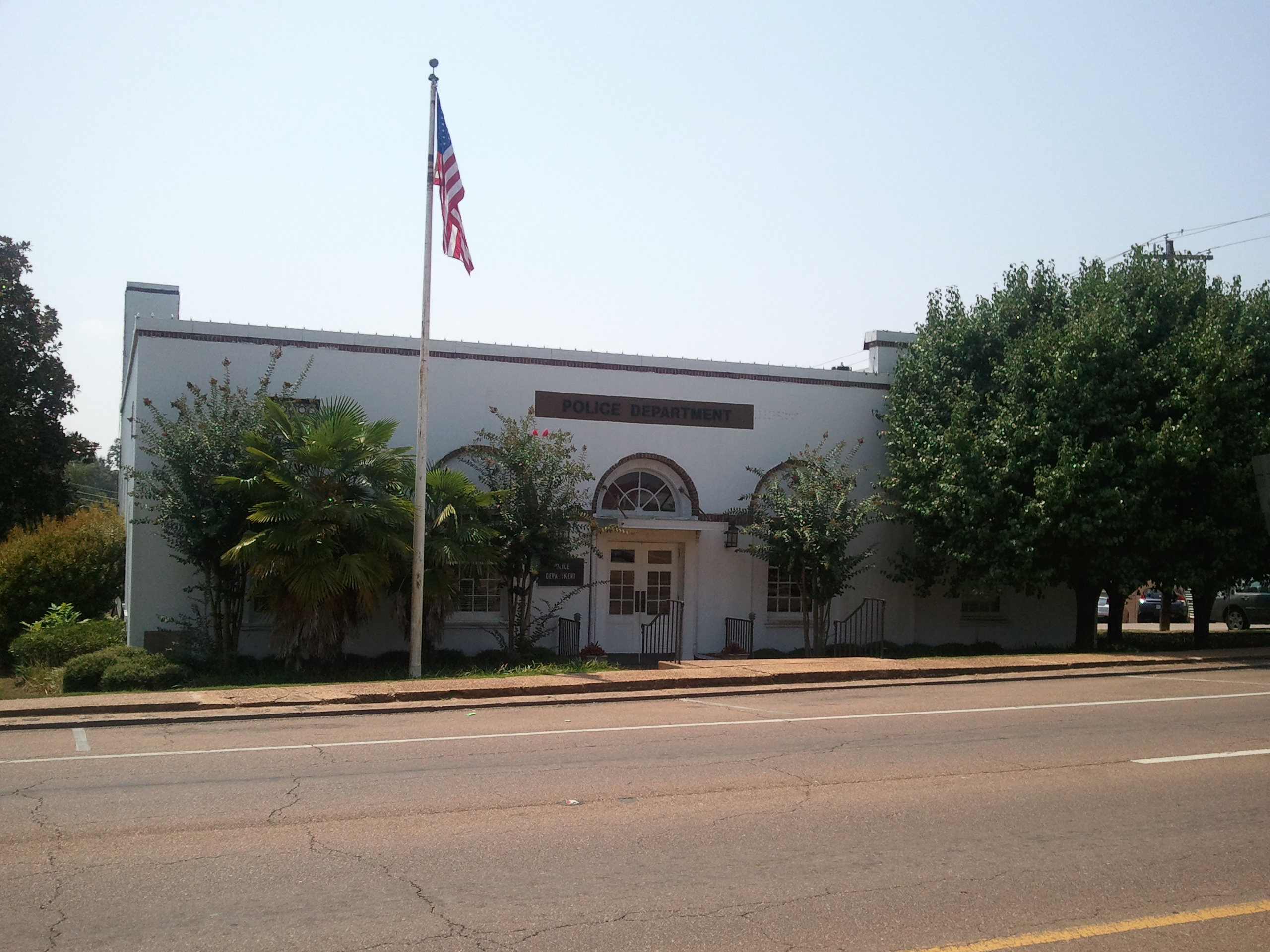

- Location within Mississippi Location within the United States
- Location: 523 Main Street, Philadelphia, Mississippi
- Coordinates: 32°46′14″N 89°6′32″W
- Area: less than one acre
- Built: 1935
- Built by: Works Progress Administration
- Architect: Neal A. Melick
- Architectural style: Classical Revival
- NRHP reference No.: 95000788
- Added to NRHP: June 30, 1995

The Old U.S. Post Office in Philadelphia, Mississippi was built in 1936. It is a structure of historical significance, being one of 32 federal post offices built in Mississippi during the Great Depression as part of U.S. President Franklin Roosevelt's New Deal public buildings program. The building was listed on the National Register of Historic Places on June 30, 1995. The building currently houses the Philadelphia police department.
