= Gloria Williamson (politician) =

Mississippi politician

Gloria Williamson was an American politician. A member of the Democratic Party, she served in the Mississippi Senate from 2000 to 2008. She was married to Ed Williamson, and they had four children. She lived in Philadelphia, Mississippi.

Williamson was Miss Neshoba County (Neshoba County).
