= Iris Kelso =

American journalist

- Born: December 10, 1926; Philadelphia, Mississippi, U.S.
- Died: November 2, 2003 (aged 76); New Orleans, Louisiana, U.S.
- Education: Philadelphia High School Ward-Belmont Junior College Randolph-Macon Women's College
- Occupations: Journalist: Political columns Human-interest essays Television commentary
- Years active: 1948-1996
- Political party: Democrat
- Spouse: Robert N. Kelso (married 1960–1972, his death)

Iris Turner Kelso (December 10, 1926 – November 2, 2003) was a Mississippi-born journalist who worked for three newspapers in New Orleans, Louisiana, including the New Orleans Times-Picayune.

== Background ==
Iris Turner was born in Philadelphia in Neshoba County in central Mississippi, a community which received national attention in the summer of 1964 because of the murder there of three young civil rights workers. Her mother, Lois Molpus Turner, died when Iris was only four, and she was reared by her father, Homer Brown Turner, her grandparents, and other extended family. She graduated from Philadelphia High School, the then Ward-Belmont Junior College in Nashville, Tennessee, and Randolph-Macon Women's College in Lynchburg, Virginia, where she majored in English.

She returned to Mississippi in 1948 to work on the staff of the Hattiesburg American in Hattiesburg in southern Mississippi. Though she covered small-town news in Hattiesburg, her interest lay in politics. Her family had long been active in reform Democratic politics; indeed Homer Turner had been a colonel on the staff of Governor Hugh L. White of Mississippi, who served from 1936 to 1940 and again from 1952 to 1956.

== Journalist in New Orleans ==
Encouraged by her editor in Hattiesburg, she moved to New Orleans in 1951 to work for the former New Orleans States-Item newspaper, an afternoon daily. She was not the first woman journalist in visible positions in New Orleans, for at least two others had preceded her in such work. Walter G. Cowan (c. 1911–2010), her boss at The States-Item, described her as a "natural reporter. It was obvious to me right off that she had the ability to talk to people and retain their confidence, even though she had to ask embarrassing questions. It's the kind of thing that rattles new reporters, but she always kept her composure."

After three years, The States-Item assigned Kelso in 1954 to the City Hall beat while deLesseps Story Morrison was the long-term mayor. She began contributing to the weekly magazine Figaro, part of the reconfigured States-Item, a combination of two afternoon newspapers. In 1959, she was sent to Baton Rouge to cover the Louisiana State Legislature, then an all-Democratic body of 144 members in both houses. Her most sensational story was the confinement and release of Governor Earl Kemp Long from a mental institution, a matter which drew national attention. She recalled having once interviewed Long in his long-handles underwear.

In 1960, Iris Turner wed Robert N. Kelso, a States-Item copy editor, who died of a lengthy illness in 1972. The couple had no children.

Kelso covered the civil rights movement and desegregation of New Orleans public schools when those activities were mostly unpopular by white voters. She attended the 1964 Democratic National Convention in Atlantic City, New Jersey, which nominated the Johnson-Humphrey ticket and is remembered for the fight over the Mississippi state delegation between party regulars and the Mississippi Freedom Democratic Party.

From 1965 to 1967, she worked for a federal War on Poverty program called Total Community Action. She was assigned to a Head Start operation to establish a medical and dental program for underprivileged children. She won a George Foster Peabody Award for an investigative series "City in Crisis", a study of municipal finances. While still writing for Figaro, she began broadcasting a weekly political commentary program, Saturday Politics, on the New Orleans NBC station WDSU-TV, where she was employed from 1967 to 1978. She attended the 1976 Democratic National Convention in New York City, which confirmed the successful Carter-Mondale ticket. At Figaro, Kelso wrote a series of stories on her own family, including a focus on her first cousin, Turner Catledge, a former managing editor of The New York Times.

She did not join The Times-Picayune, her last employer, until 1979. She continued with Figaro, by then a separate magazine, in which she revealed the story of the feuding sons of the late political boss Leander Perez and the breakup of their political empire and oil lands in nearby Plaquemines Parish. She covered David Duke, the former figure in the Ku Klux Klan who served briefly in the state legislature and ran unsuccessfully for the U.S. Senate and for governor. Other Kelso topics included female politicians, the environment, abortion, teenage pregnancy, and the nationally known Neshoba County Fair in her native Neshoba County, where Ronald W. Reagan in 1980 launched his general election campaign. She listed Eleanor Roosevelt as her single most interesting interviewee and Edwin Edwards as the most interesting of the six governors that she covered, but she determined that her readers especially enjoyed her columns on her own family.

== Legacy ==
Upon Kelso's death in 2003, Clancy Dubos, a New Orleans columnist in his Internet publication Gambit, called Kelso "the last of the Steel Magnolias." In reference to Kelso's journalistic integrity, Dubos recalled his own father saying that a Kelso column was the "last word on politics" in their household. Dubos recalled that Kelso had taken time for him to interview her for his graduate thesis, but years later she could hardly recall having done the favor for Dubos.

In 1997, Kelso was inducted into the Louisiana Center for Women and Government Hall of Fame located at Nicholls State University in Thibodaux, Louisiana. In 1999, Kelso, along with two other New Orleans figures, political scientist and commentator Ed Renwick and former Lieutenant Governor Jimmy Fitzmorris, was inducted into the Louisiana Political Museum and Hall of Fame in Winnfield. Kelso's papers were deposited posthumously at the Earl K. Long Library at the University of New Orleans.
