= Greg Eiland =

American football player (born 1998)

No. 63 – Edmonton Elks
- Position: Offensive tackle
- Roster status: Suspended
- CFL status: American

Personal information
- Born: February 1, 1998 (age 28); Philadelphia, Mississippi, U.S.
- Listed height: 6 ft 8 in (2.03 m)
- Listed weight: 321 lb (146 kg)

Career information
- High school: Philadelphia (MS)
- College: Mississippi State (2016–2020)
- NFL draft: 2021: undrafted

Career history
- Seattle Seahawks (2021–2023)*; San Antonio Brahmas (2024–2025); Edmonton Elks (2025–present)
- * Offseason or practice squad member only
- Stats at Pro Football Reference

Gregory Antonio Eiland (born February 1, 1998) is an American professional football offensive tackle for the Edmonton Elks of the Canadian Football League (CFL). He played college football at Mississippi State.

== Early life ==
Eiland was born on February 1, 1998, in Philadelphia, Mississippi. He started his football career in the Philadelphia Youth Football League. He was a two-year starter in high school varsity football at Philadelphia High School.

== College career ==
Eiland played college football for the Mississippi State Bulldogs. He appeared in 47 career games with 34 starts on the offensive line for the Bulldogs.

== Professional career ==
Pre-draft measurables
Height	Weight	Arm length	Hand span	Wingspan	40-yard dash	10-yard split	20-yard split	Vertical jump	Broad jump	Bench press
6 ft 7 7/8 in (2.03 m)	321 lb (146 kg)	37 in (0.94 m)	10 7/8 in (0.28 m)	7 ft 4 1/8 in (2.24 m)	5.77 s	2.03 s	3.28 s	26.5 in (0.67 m)	8 ft 1 in (2.46 m)	8 reps
All values from Pro Day

=== Seattle Seahawks ===
After not being selected in the 2021 NFL draft, Eiland signed with the Seattle Seahawks as an undrafted free agent on May 13, 2021. He was assigned to the practice squad on September 1, 2021. He was waived on August 30, 2022, but he was re-signed to the practice squad the next day. He was signed to a reserve/future contract on January 16, 2023. He was waived on August 29, 2023, and re-signed to the practice squad the next day. He was waived from the practice squad on August 31, was brought back on September 11, and released again on September 21. He was signed back to the practice squad on October 18, 2023, and released again on October 30.

=== San Antonio Brahmas ===
On January 19, 2024, Eiland signed with the San Antonio Brahmas of the United Football League (UFL). He was placed on injured reserve on April 16. Eiland was activated on May 20. He was released on May 5, 2025.

=== Edmonton Elks ===
It was announced on May 26, 2025 that Eiland had signed with the Edmonton Elks.
