= States' rights speech =

1980 speech by Ronald Reagan

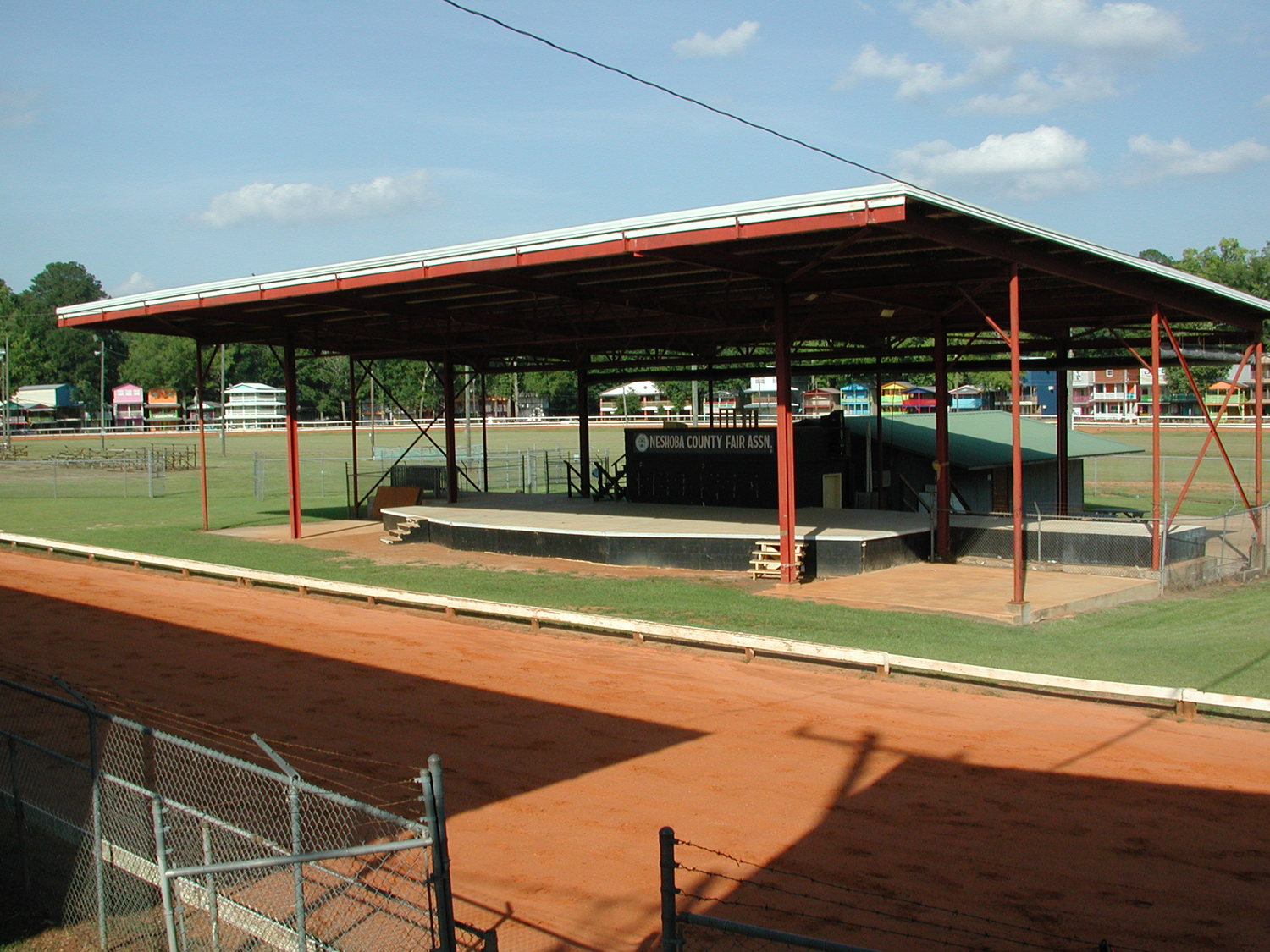
Neshoba County Fair grandstand, where Ronald Reagan's speech was delivered

On August 3, 1980, presidential candidate Ronald Reagan appeared at the Neshoba County Fair in Neshoba County, Mississippi, to give a speech on states' rights. The location, which was near the site of the 1964 murders of civil rights activists James Chaney, Andrew Goodman, and Michael Schwerner by Ku Klux Klan members was, according to critics, evidence of racial bias.

== Location ==
Republican Party political strategists chose the Neshoba County Fair for the speech as part of an effort to win over rural voters in the Southern United States. The venue, while also offering the traditional elements of rural county fairs, had become recognized for political speechmaking by 1980. The Ronald Reagan 1980 presidential campaign saw breaking president Jimmy Carter's hold on southern states as critical to winning that year's presidential election. Lanny Griffith, then-Mississippi state Republican director, explained:

It was not a mistake that Reagan went to the Neshoba County Fair, rather than Jackson. This was sort of heresy, going out in these rural areas ... [but] I know from my standpoint in 1980, we were just obsessed with how you turn around these rural counties and get them started voting with us.

Some members of the Reagan campaign anonymously expressed their discomfort with the choice to a Washington Post reporter: "It would have been like we were coming to Mississippi and winking at the folks here, saying we didn't really mean to be talking to them Urban League folk. ... It would have been the wrong signal."

== Speech ==
Reagan was hosted by Republican representative Trent Lott. Approximately 15,000 people attended Reagan's speech. During his speech, Reagan said:

I still believe the answer to any problem lies with the people. I believe in states' rights. I believe in people doing as much as they can for themselves at the community level and at the private level, and I believe we've distorted the balance of our government today by giving powers that were never intended in the Constitution to that federal establishment.

He went on to promise to "restore to states and local governments the power that properly belongs to them". The use of the phrase "states' rights" was seen by some as a tacit appeal to Southern white voters and a continuation of Richard Nixon's Southern strategy, while others argued it merely reflected his libertarian beliefs in economics.

== Reception ==
Coverage of the speech by the media immediately focused on the use of the phrase "states' rights". The headline the next day in The New York Times read, "REAGAN CAMPAIGNS AT MISSISSIPPI FAIR; Nominee Tells Crowd of 10,000 He Is Backing States' Rights." Coverage of Reagan's subsequent campaign stops in the North explicitly linked the location of the speech to the murders of Chaney, Goodman, and Schwerner. On August 6, Douglas Kneeland of the Times wrote, "Adding perhaps to the cautious reception he was given by the Urban League here was Mr. Reagan's appearance Sunday at the Neshoba County Fair in Philadelphia, Miss., where three young civil rights workers were slain in 1964."

States' rights had for decades been a rallying slogan for racial segregationists, including Strom Thurmond in the 1948 presidential election and George Wallace in the 1968 presidential election, and several press writers interpreted Reagan's use of the phrase according to that tradition. Columnist Bob Herbert of the Times wrote, "Everybody watching the 1980 campaign knew what Reagan was signaling at the fair", and that it "was understood that when politicians started chirping about 'states' rights' to white people in places like Neshoba County they were saying that when it comes down to you and the blacks, we're with you". Paul Krugman, also of the Times, noted that a Republican national committee member from Mississippi had urged Reagan to speak at the county fair, as it would help win over "George Wallace-inclined voters", and wrote that this was just one of many examples of "Reagan's tacit race-baiting in the historical record."

Eulogizing on Reagan's death, Washington Post columnist William Raspberry noted of the incident:

It was bitter symbolism for black Americans (though surely not just for black Americans). Countless observers have noted that Reagan took the Republican Party from virtual irrelevance to the ascendancy it now enjoys. The essence of that transformation, we shouldn't forget, is the party's successful wooing of the race-exploiting Southern Democrats formerly known as Dixiecrats. And Reagan's Philadelphia appearance was an important bouquet in that courtship.

Others, including the Washington Post editorial page, contended that there was nothing racist about Reagan's use of the phrase "states' rights" in the context of the speech; The New Republic criticized Carter's allegations of racism, calling them "frightful distortions, bordering on outright lies." David Brooks of The New York Times responded to the article by fellow Times columnist Krugman, and called the attention paid to the "states' rights" phrase a "slur" and a "distortion." He wrote that the campaign had been somewhat forced by the county fair organizers who had announced Reagan's appearance, and that the "states' rights" phrase was used in the part of his speech, but that the speech was mostly about inflation and the economy and how it related to schools. Brooks wrote that Reagan had been courting black voters at that time, and he flew to New York City after the speech to deliver an address to the Urban League. In the same article, Brooks does admit, however, that:

You can look back on this history in many ways. It's callous, at least, to use the phrase "states' rights" in any context in Philadelphia. Reagan could have done something wonderful if he'd mentioned civil rights at the fair. He didn't. And it's obviously true that race played a role in the G.O.P.'s ascent.

This caused Herbert to respond a few days later with an op-ed column titled "Righting Reagan's Wrongs?", in which he wrote:

Reagan was the first presidential candidate ever to appear at the fair, and he knew exactly what he was doing when he told that crowd, "I believe in states' rights." Reagan apologists have every right to be ashamed of that appearance by their hero, but they have no right to change the meaning of it, which was unmistakable. Commentators have been trying of late to put this appearance by Reagan into a racially benign context.

== Aftermath ==
On November 4, Reagan won Mississippi by a narrow plurality of 11,808 votes, including Neshoba County with a 1,293 vote majority.

In subsequent presidential elections, candidates John Glenn and Michael Dukakis both campaigned at the venue.

== See also ==
- Speeches and debates of Ronald Reagan
