= Mike Eakes =

American politician

Member of the Mississippi House of Representatives from the 44th district
- In office January 4, 2000 – January 6, 2004
- Preceded by: V. C. Manning
- Succeeded by: C. Scott Bounds
- In office January 7, 1992 – January 2, 1996
- Preceded by: Buck Bounds
- Succeeded by: V. C. Manning
- In office January 8, 1980 – January 5, 1988
- Preceded by: J. P. Compretta
- Succeeded by: Buck Bounds

Personal details
- Born: Grady Michael Eakes; January 28, 1945 Philadelphia, Mississippi, U.S.
- Died: August 11, 2005 (aged 60) Philadelphia, Mississippi, U.S.
- Party: Democratic
- Spouse: Linda Hill
- Education: Mississippi State University

Military service
- Allegiance: United States
- Branch/service: United States Navy
- Battles/wars: Vietnam War

Grady Michael Eakes (January 28, 1945 – August 11, 2005) was an American politician. A member of the Democratic Party, he served three times in the Mississippi House of Representatives. He died in 2005.
