= J. P. Compretta =

American politician

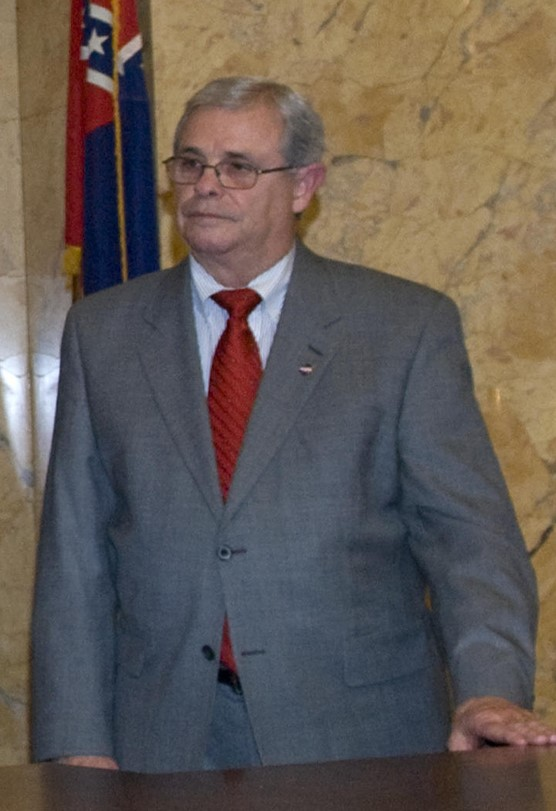
- Compretta in 2010

Member of the Mississippi House of Representatives from the 122nd district
- In office January 5, 1988 – January 3, 2012
- Preceded by: Walter James Phillips
- Succeeded by: David Baria
- In office January 8, 1980 – January 3, 1984
- Succeeded by: Walter James Phillips

Member of the Mississippi House of Representatives from the 44th district
- In office January 1976 – January 8, 1980
- Succeeded by: Mike Eakes

Personal details
- Born: Joseph Patrick Compretta; March 17, 1945 (age 81) Fort Lauderdale, Florida, U.S.
- Party: Democratic
- Spouse: Kay Dorich
- Education: University of Southern Mississippi (BS); Mississippi College (JD)
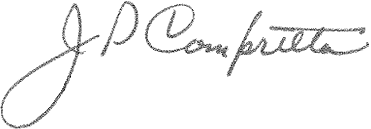
- Signature

Joseph Patrick "J.P." Compretta (born March 17, 1945) is a Mississippi lawyer and Democratic Party politician. He is a former member of the Mississippi House of Representatives, representing the 122nd house district (part of Hancock County). Compretta was Speaker Pro Tempore of the House and Chairman of the Management Committee, also serving on the Judiciary, Marine Resources and Ways & Means committees.

== Background ==
Compretta was born March 17, 1945, in Fort Lauderdale, Florida. He attended Pearl River Junior College, the University of Southern Mississippi and the Mississippi College School of Law. He worked as a lawyer, and served as County Prosecutor, City Prosecutor and Assistant District Attorney before being elected to the House in 1975.

== Service in the House of Representatives ==
Compretta was first elected to the House in 1975. He served two terms (1976–1984). He was then elected again in 1987, and was re-elected until stepping down before the 2011 election. He was succeeded by fellow Democrat David Baria.

== Personal life ==
He is married to the former Kay Dorich; they live in Bay St. Louis.
