= Sandtown, Mississippi =

- Unincorporated community
- Location within Mississippi Location within the United States
- Coordinates: 32°47′41″N 89°00′06″W
- Country: United States
- State: Mississippi
- County: Neshoba
- Elevation: 590 ft (180 m)
- Time zone: UTC-6 (Central (CST))
  - Summer (DST): UTC-5 (CDT)
- ZIP code: 39350
- Area code: 601
- GNIS feature ID: 692207

Sandtown is an unincorporated community located in Neshoba County, Mississippi, United States. Sandtown is approximately 4.7 miles (7.6 km) southwest of Bogue Chitto along Mississippi Highway 482.

Sandtown's name is derived from the translation of the name of a Choctaw village that previously occupied the site. The village was known as Shinuk Kaha in Choctaw, which translates to lying in the sand.
