= Turner Catledge =

American journalist (1901–1983)

Turner Catledge (left) sitting with columnist Joseph Alsop (right) at the White House.

William Turner Catledge (/ˈkætlɪdʒ/; 1901–1983) was an American journalist, best known for his work at The New York Times. He was managing editor from 1952 to 1964 when he became the paper's first executive editor.

After retiring in 1968, he served briefly on the board of The New York Times company as a vice president. He published his autobiography, My Life and The Times, in 1971.

== Early life ==
Catledge was born on March 17, 1901, to his parents, Lee Johnston Catledge and Willie Anna Turner, and older sister Bessie Lee Catledge, on his grandfather's 900-acre (3.6 km^{2}) farm in Ackerman, Mississippi. When he was three, his family moved to Philadelphia, Mississippi. After graduating from Philadelphia High School in 1918, he enrolled at Mississippi A&M with a science major.

== Career in journalism ==
Catledge's first news job was at fourteen years old for the Neshoba Democrat, setting type. After college, the Democrat offered him another job but instead, he became editor of the Tunica Times (Tunica, Mississippi) in 1922. Clayton Rand, the publisher of the Times (a newspaper aligned with the interests of white planters), ran a series of stories denouncing the Ku Klux Klan; under intense pressure from local merchants, Rand sold the newspaper to another publisher, putting Catledge out of work. Catledge later served as managing editor and mechanical superintendent of the Tupelo Journal (Tupelo, Mississippi), and then worked for The Commercial Appeal in Memphis, Tennessee.

Finally, in the spring of 1929, Catledge began working at The New York Times, starting in the New York bureau, until later when he began work in the company's Washington, D.C. bureau as a reporter covering the U.S. House of Representatives.

In the winter of 1941, he left the New York Times to become chief correspondent and later Editor-in-Chief of the Chicago Sun. In 1943, he was rehired by The New York Times as a national correspondent.

Over the remainder of his career, he worked for the Times as managing editor, executive editor, and last as the company's vice president.

== Family life ==
On March 19, 1931, Catledge married Mildred Turpin, with whom he had two children, Mildred Lee in 1932, and Ellen Douglas in 1936. They married at the Church of the Transfiguration in New York. In 1949, Catledge and wife Mildred divorced; he married his second wife, widow Abby Ray Izard, in December 1957.

Catledge was a first cousin of the New Orleans–based journalist Iris Turner Kelso.

== Death ==
Turner Catledge died in 1983, age 82.

== Honors and recognition ==
Catledge was a member of the Century Club in New York, the Metropolitan Club in Washington and the Boston Club in New Orleans, among others, and held honorary degrees from Tulane and Washington and Lee Universities and the University of Kentucky. In 1971, he received the Golden Plate Award of the American Academy of Achievement.

== In literature ==
- The Broadway play The Girls in 509 by author Howard M. Teichmann was dedicated to Turner Catledge.

To TURNER CATLEDGE, gentleman journalist, who nightly played his role faultlessly, whose behavior before, during, and after each performance was exemplary—and whose good humour and graciousness are deeply appreciated.

- In his memoir The Good Times, Russell Baker includes a chapter that prominently features Turner Catledge, who was managing editor of The New York Times at the time Baker joined the staff as a reporter.
