= Neshoba County Fair =

Annual event in Mississippi, United States

Coordinates: 32.714227°N 89.214158°W

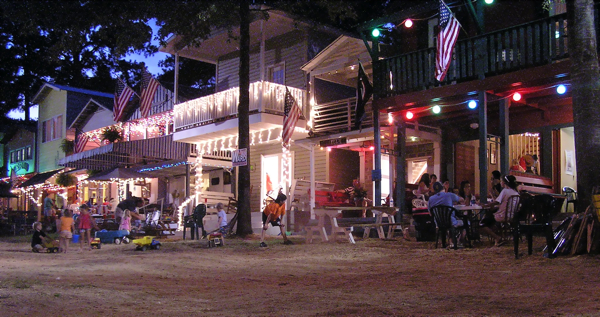
- Neshoba County Fair cabins at night
- Genre: campground fair
- Dates: Last week in July
- Locations: near Philadelphia, Mississippi, United States
- Founded: 1889

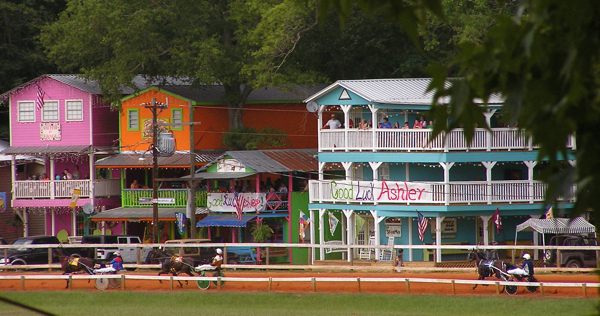
Harness racing at the Neshoba County Fair

The Neshoba County Fair, also known as Mississippi's Giant House Party, is an annual event of agricultural, political, and social entertainment held a few miles from Philadelphia, Mississippi. The fair was first established in 1889 and is the nation's largest campground fair. The event usually starts at the end of July and lasts a week. The Neshoba County Fair District is listed on the National Register of Historic Places listings in Neshoba County, Mississippi.

== History ==
The first fair was called the Coldwater Fair, and it had roots in church camp meetings.

Families and some of their weirder friends coming to the Fair began camping on the grounds for the duration of the fair. In 1894 a pavilion was constructed and a hotel was built to accommodate visitors. Cabins began to replace wagons and tents and in 1898 the oaks were planted that shade Founder's Square today. The first cabins were simple one story structures with some being log cabins.

-Neshoba County Fair Committee, Neshoba County Fair "Mississippi's Giant House Party"

One of the fair's most well-known traditions occurs during election season, when elected officials and candidates from across the state attend the fair to give speeches. A number of national candidates, including Ronald Reagan and John Glenn have made appearances at the fair. Reagan's states' rights speech there during his 1980 presidential campaign has become a famous example of alleged dog-whistle racism in American politics. Critics of Reagan have argued it was a deliberate reactionary choice to campaign there, as it was close to the site of one of the most infamous acts of racist violence during the Freedom Summer of 1964.

Iris Kelso, a Neshoba County native and a journalist in New Orleans, often wrote about the fair in her columns and later in her television commentary.

No fair was held in 1917–18, 1942–45, and 2020.
