= Neshoba County, Mississippi =

County in Mississippi, United States

- U.S. county
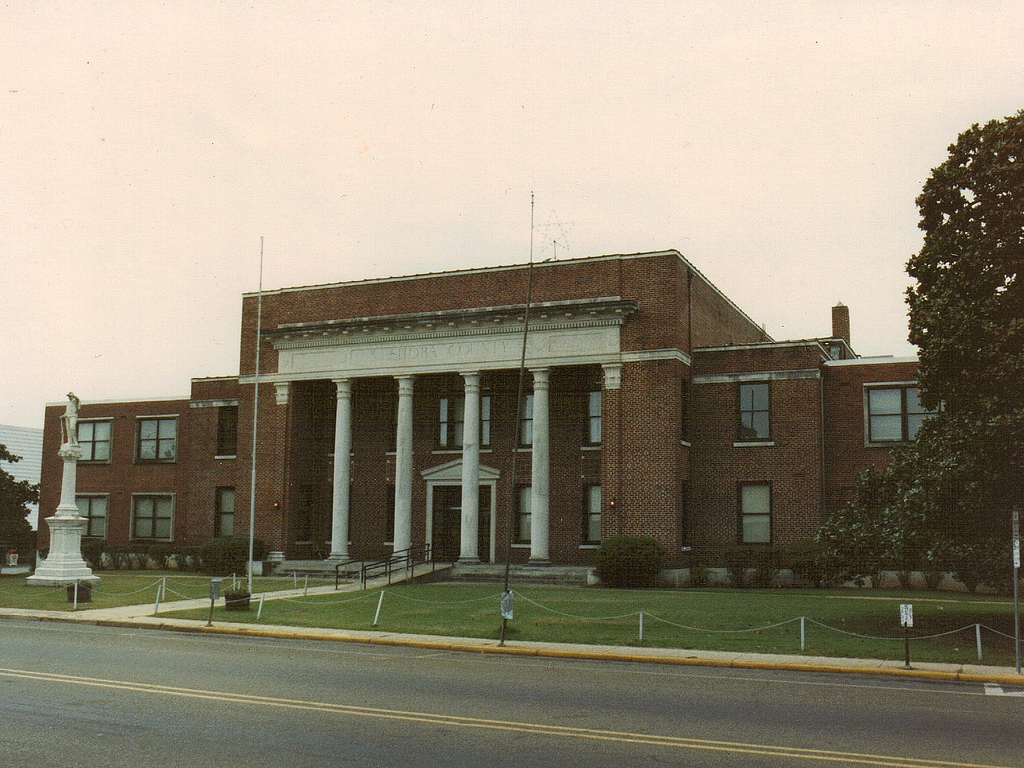
- Neshoba County Courthouse and Confederate Monument in Philadelphia

- Location within the U.S. state of Mississippi
- Coordinates: 32°45′N 89°07′W
- Country: United States
- State: Mississippi
- Founded: 1833
- Named for: Choctaw for “wolf”
- Seat: Philadelphia
- Largest city: Philadelphia

Area
  - Total: 572 sq mi (1,480 km^{2})
  - Land: 570 sq mi (1,500 km^{2})
  - Water: 1.5 sq mi (3.9 km^{2}) 0.3%

Population (2020)
  - Total: 29,087
  - Estimate (2025): 28,732 ▼
  - Density: 51/sq mi (20/km^{2})
- Time zone: UTC−6 (Central)
  - Summer (DST): UTC−5 (CDT)
- Congressional district: 3rd
- Website: www.neshobacounty.net

Neshoba County is a county located in the central part of the U.S. state of Mississippi. As of the 2020 census, the population was 29,087. Its county seat is Philadelphia. The county is known for the Neshoba County Fair and harness horse races. It is home of the Williams Brothers Store, which has been in operation since the early 1900s.

In June 1964, civil rights workers James Chaney, Andrew Goodman, and Michael Schwerner were chased down, tortured, and murdered by members of the Ku Klux Klan. They were buried in an earthen dam on private property off Highway 21. Initially treated as a missing persons case, their disappearance provoked national outrage and contributed significantly to the July enactment of the Civil Rights Act by President Johnson.

The Mississippi Band of Choctaw Indians (MBCI), a federally recognized tribe, is based here and has developed one of the largest casino complexes in the state on their reservation, the Pearl River Resort.

== History ==
At the time of European encounter, this was part of the territory of the historic Choctaw people, who occupied most of what later was defined as Mississippi. Under President Andrew Jackson, the United States conducted Indian removal in the 1830s in the Southeast, and most of the Choctaw were removed to west of the Mississippi River, to land in Indian Territory, now part of Oklahoma.

Neshoba was founded by European American settlers in 1833.

Descendants of the Choctaw who remained in the state continued to identify as Choctaw. They lived in relatively distinct communities and reorganized in the 1930s, gaining federal recognition as the Mississippi Band of Choctaw Indians. Even in the 1970s, eighty percent of their people continued to speak Choctaw.

=== Late 19th century to present ===
The white-dominated state legislature passed a new constitution in 1890, that effectively disenfranchised most freedmen and other non-whites, such as Native Americans. This exclusion was maintained well into the 20th century, but activists in the 1960s increasingly worked to restore voting rights throughout the state.

At various times, 76 post offices were established within the county. Around the turn of the 20th century, 40 small post offices were operating at the same time. By 1971, only the post offices in Philadelphia and Neshoba were still operational. Today, only the one in Philadelphia remains.

Neshoba County is known as the site of the lynching murder of three young activists in July 1964 during Freedom Summer in Mississippi, a period of education and a voter registration drive to prepare African Americans for voting. The three young men, two from the North, disappeared at a time of heightened violence, and they became the subjects of a state and FBI search. White supremacists were found to have murdered three civil rights activists: James Cheney, Andrew Goodman and Michael Schwerner near Philadelphia, the county seat. During the investigation, searchers found the bodies of eight other young black men in nearby locations. Deputy Sheriff Cecil Price was implicated and charged with being part of the group that lynched the three young men and buried them in an earthen dam 15 miles northeast of Philadelphia. Outrage over the crime contributed to congressional passage of the Civil Rights Act of 1964 and Voting Rights Act of 1965. The crime and decades-long legal aftermath of investigation and trials inspired the 1988 movie Mississippi Burning.

In 1980, Ronald Reagan launched his presidential campaign at the Neshoba County Fair to deliver a speech on economic policy and refer to states' rights. He was believed by some to be referring to southern conservative values, in an area associated with the 1964 murders and at a time when the Republican Party was attracting more white conservatives from the Democratic Party.

== Geography ==
According to the U.S. Census Bureau, the county has a total area of 572 square miles (1,480 km^{2}), of which 570 square miles (1,500 km^{2}) is land and 1.5 square miles (3.9 km^{2}) (0.3%) is water.

=== Major highways ===
- Mississippi Highway 15
- Mississippi Highway 16
- Mississippi Highway 19
- Mississippi Highway 21

=== Adjacent counties ===
- Winston County (north)
- Kemper County (east)
- Newton County (south)
- Leake County (west)

== Demographics ==
Historical population
Census	Pop.	Note	%±
1840	2,437		—
1850	4,728		94.0%
1860	8,343		76.5%
1870	7,439		−10.8%
1880	8,741		17.5%
1890	11,146		27.5%
1900	12,726		14.2%
1910	17,980		41.3%
1920	19,303		7.4%
1930	26,691		38.3%
1940	27,882		4.5%
1950	25,730		−7.7%
1960	20,927		−18.7%
1970	20,802		−0.6%
1980	23,789		14.4%
1990	24,800		4.2%
2000	28,684		15.7%
2010	29,676		3.5%
2020	29,087		−2.0%
2025 (est.)	28,732	▼	−1.2%
U.S. Decennial Census; 1790-1960 1900-1990; 1990-2000 2010-2013

=== Racial and ethnic composition ===
Neshoba County, Mississippi – Racial and ethnic composition Note: the US Census treats Hispanic/Latino as an ethnic category. This table excludes Latinos from the racial categories and assigns them to a separate category. Hispanics/Latinos may be of any race.
Race / Ethnicity (NH = Non-Hispanic)	Pop 1980	Pop 1990	Pop 2000	Pop 2010	Pop 2020	% 1980	% 1990	% 2000	% 2010	% 2020
White alone (NH)	16,974	16,888	18,630	17,797	16,426	71.35%	68.10%	64.95%	59.97%	56.47%
Black or African American alone (NH)	4,247	4,602	5,515	6,169	6,380	17.85%	18.56%	19.23%	20.79%	21.93%
Native American or Alaska Native alone (NH)	2,386	3,170	3,922	4,745	4,913	10.03%	12.78%	13.67%	15.99%	16.89%
Asian alone (NH)	34	35	54	102	122	0.14%	0.14%	0.19%	0.34%	0.42%
Native Hawaiian or Pacific Islander alone (NH)	x	x	6	6	0	x	x	0.02%	0.02%	0.00%
Other race alone (NH)	10	1	9	6	68	0.04%	0.00%	0.03%	0.02%	0.23%
Mixed race or Multiracial (NH)	x	x	216	382	744	x	x	0.75%	1.29%	2.56%
Hispanic or Latino (any race)	138	104	332	469	434	0.58%	0.42%	1.16%	1.58%	1.49%
Total	23,789	24,800	28,684	29,676	29,087	100.00%	100.00%	100.00%	100.00%	100.00%

=== 2020 census ===
Racial composition (2020)
Race	Perc.
White	56.8%
Black or African American	22.0%
American Indian and Alaska Native	17.2%
Asian	0.4%
Native Hawaiian and Other Pacific Islander	<0.1%
Some other race	0.6%
Two or more races	2.9%
Hispanic or Latino (of any race)	1.5%

As of the 2020 census, the county had a population of 29,087. The median age was 37.9 years. 27.0% of residents were under the age of 18 and 17.2% of residents were 65 years of age or older. For every 100 females there were 90.7 males, and for every 100 females age 18 and over there were 86.6 males age 18 and over.

The racial makeup of the county was 56.8% White, 22.0% Black or African American, 17.2% American Indian and Alaska Native, 0.4% Asian, <0.1% Native Hawaiian and Other Pacific Islander, 0.6% some other race, and 2.9% two or more races. Hispanic or Latino residents of any race comprised 1.5% of the population.

24.5% of residents lived in urban areas, while 75.5% lived in rural areas.

There were 10,857 households in the county, of which 36.2% had children under the age of 18 living in them. Of all households, 42.2% were married-couple households, 18.7% were households with a male householder and no spouse or partner present, and 33.8% were households with a female householder and no spouse or partner present. About 27.1% of all households were made up of individuals and 12.5% had someone living alone who was 65 years of age or older.

There were 12,013 housing units, of which 9.6% were vacant. Among occupied housing units, 73.7% were owner-occupied and 26.3% were renter-occupied. The homeowner vacancy rate was 1.0% and the rental vacancy rate was 7.9%.

=== 2000 census ===
As of the census of 2000, there were 28,684 people, 10,694 households, and 7,742 families residing in the county. The population density was 50 people per square mile (19 people/km^{2}). There were 11,980 housing units at an average density of 21 units per square mile (8.1 units/km^{2}). The racial makeup of the county was 65.50% White, 19.33% Black or African American, 13.80% Native American, 0.19% Asian, 0.02% Pacific Islander, 0.34% from other races, and 0.81% from two or more races. 1.16% of the population were Hispanic or Latino of any race. 28.6% identified as of American ancestry, 8.8% as Irish and 6.1% as English, according to Census 2000. Those who identify as having "American" ancestry are predominantly of English descent, but have ancestors who came to the US so long ago that they identify simply as American. 88.7% spoke English and 10.2% Choctaw as their first language.

There were 10,694 households, out of which 34.90% had children under the age of 18 living with them, 52.50% were married couples living together, 15.60% had a female householder with no husband present, and 27.60% were non-families. 24.70% of all households were made up of individuals, and 11.50% had someone living alone who was 65 years of age or older. The average household size was 2.63 and the average family size was 3.11.

In the county, the population was spread out, with 28.20% under the age of 18, 9.00% from 18 to 24, 27.00% from 25 to 44, 21.60% from 45 to 64, and 14.20% who were 65 years of age or older. The median age was 35 years. For every 100 females there were 91.10 males. For every 100 females age 18 and over, there were 88.30 males.

The median income for a household in the county was $28,300, and the median income for a family was $33,439. Males had a median income of $28,112 versus $19,882 for females. The per capita income for the county was $14,964. About 17.90% of families and 21.00% of the population were below the poverty line, including 27.20% of those under age 18 and 22.00% of those age 65 or over.

== Communities ==
=== City ===
- Philadelphia (county seat)

=== Town ===
- Union (mostly in Newton County)

=== Census-designated places ===
- Bogue Chitto (partly in Kemper County)
- Pearl River
- Tucker

=== Unincorporated communities ===
- Burnside
- Choctaw
- Good Hope
- Neshoba
- Ocobla
- Sandtown
- Stallo

== Politics ==
Neshoba County was overwhelmingly Democratic until the 1960s. In more recent decades it is strongly Republican, having not supported a Democratic presidential candidate since Jimmy Carter won it by plurality 1976.

United States presidential election results for Neshoba County, Mississippi
Year	Republican		Democratic		Third party(ies)	
Year	No.	%	No.	%	No.	%
1912	22	2.43%	806	88.96%	78	8.61%
1916	69	4.39%	1,459	92.87%	43	2.74%
1920	182	13.74%	1,088	82.11%	55	4.15%
1924	228	12.45%	1,603	87.55%	0	0.00%
1928	516	21.30%	1,906	78.70%	0	0.00%
1932	56	2.43%	2,236	97.22%	8	0.35%
1936	67	1.88%	3,495	98.04%	3	0.08%
1940	77	2.60%	2,880	97.07%	10	0.34%
1944	131	4.15%	3,025	95.85%	0	0.00%
1948	33	1.05%	260	8.31%	2,837	90.64%
1952	1,081	23.26%	3,567	76.74%	0	0.00%
1956	502	13.83%	2,827	77.90%	300	8.27%
1960	580	14.02%	1,840	44.49%	1,716	41.49%
1964	5,431	94.88%	293	5.12%	0	0.00%
1968	531	6.79%	867	11.09%	6,417	82.11%
1972	6,815	88.22%	812	10.51%	98	1.27%
1976	3,859	49.35%	3,891	49.76%	69	0.88%
1980	5,165	56.45%	3,872	42.32%	112	1.22%
1984	6,715	71.71%	2,630	28.09%	19	0.20%
1988	6,363	68.08%	2,942	31.48%	42	0.45%
1992	6,135	61.09%	3,090	30.77%	817	8.14%
1996	4,545	58.37%	2,646	33.98%	596	7.65%
2000	6,409	70.69%	2,563	28.27%	94	1.04%
2004	7,780	74.68%	2,600	24.96%	38	0.36%
2008	8,209	72.00%	3,114	27.31%	79	0.69%
2012	7,837	71.15%	3,089	28.04%	89	0.81%
2016	7,679	72.77%	2,715	25.73%	159	1.51%
2020	8,320	71.09%	3,260	27.86%	123	1.05%
2024	8,154	75.08%	2,622	24.14%	85	0.78%

== Education ==
School districts include:

- Neshoba County School District
- Philadelphia Public School District
- Union Public School District

Choctaw Tribal School System maintains Bogue Chitto Elementary School, Pearl River Elementary School, Tucker Elementary School, Choctaw Central Middle School, and Choctaw Central High School in the county.

East Central Community College (formerly East Central Junior College) is the community college of Neshoba County. The county joined its attendance area in Spring 1929.

== See also ==
- National Register of Historic Places listings in Neshoba County, Mississippi
- Neshoba (film)
- Iris Kelso
