= Philadelphia, Mississippi =

City in Mississippi, United States

- City
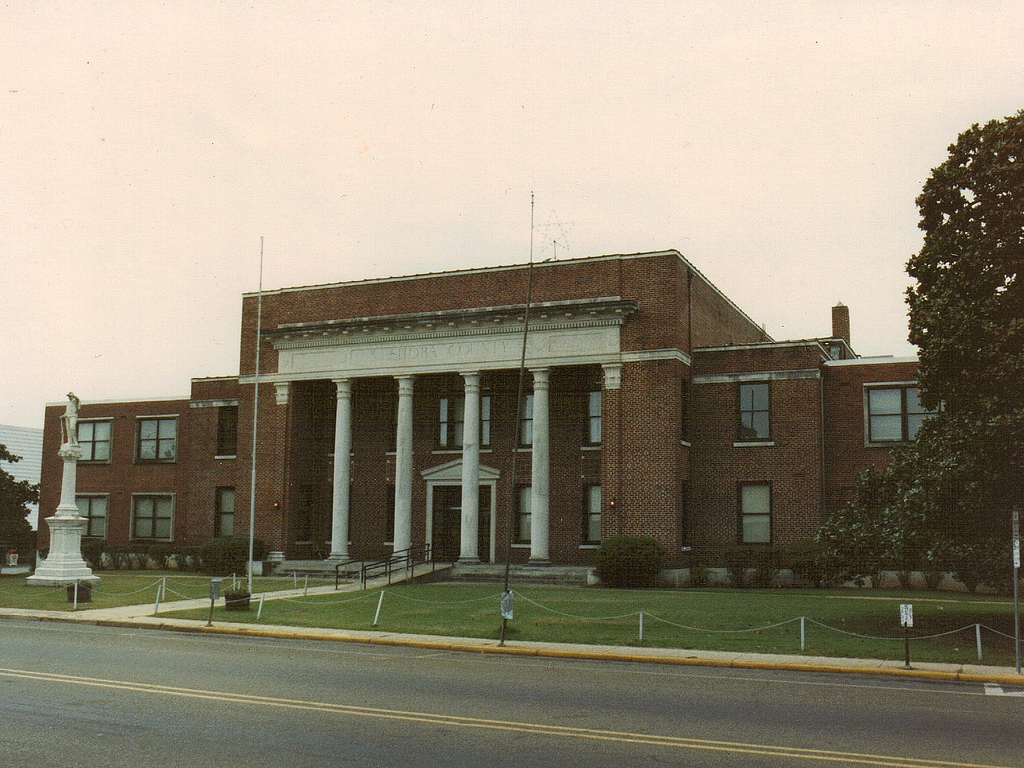
- Neshoba County courthouse in Philadelphia

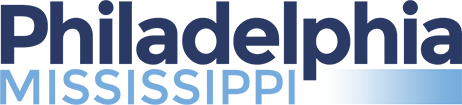
- Logo

- Location of Philadelphia, Mississippi

- Location in the United States
- Coordinates: 32°46′27″N 89°6′46″W
- Country: United States
- State: Mississippi
- County: Neshoba
- Named for: Philadelphia, Pennsylvania

Government
  - Mayor: Jim Fulton (R)

Area
  - Total: 12.22 sq mi (31.66 km^{2})
  - Land: 12.21 sq mi (31.63 km^{2})
  - Water: 0.015 sq mi (0.04 km^{2})
- Elevation: 423 ft (129 m)

Population (2020)
  - Total: 7,118
  - Density: 582.9/sq mi (225.07/km^{2})
- Time zone: UTC-6 (Central (CST))
  - Summer (DST): UTC-5 (CDT)
- ZIP code: 39350
- Area code: 601
- FIPS code: 28-56960
- GNIS feature ID: 0675674
- Website: philadelphiathecity.com

Philadelphia is a city in and the county seat of Neshoba County, Mississippi, United States. The population was 7,118 at the 2020 census.

== History ==
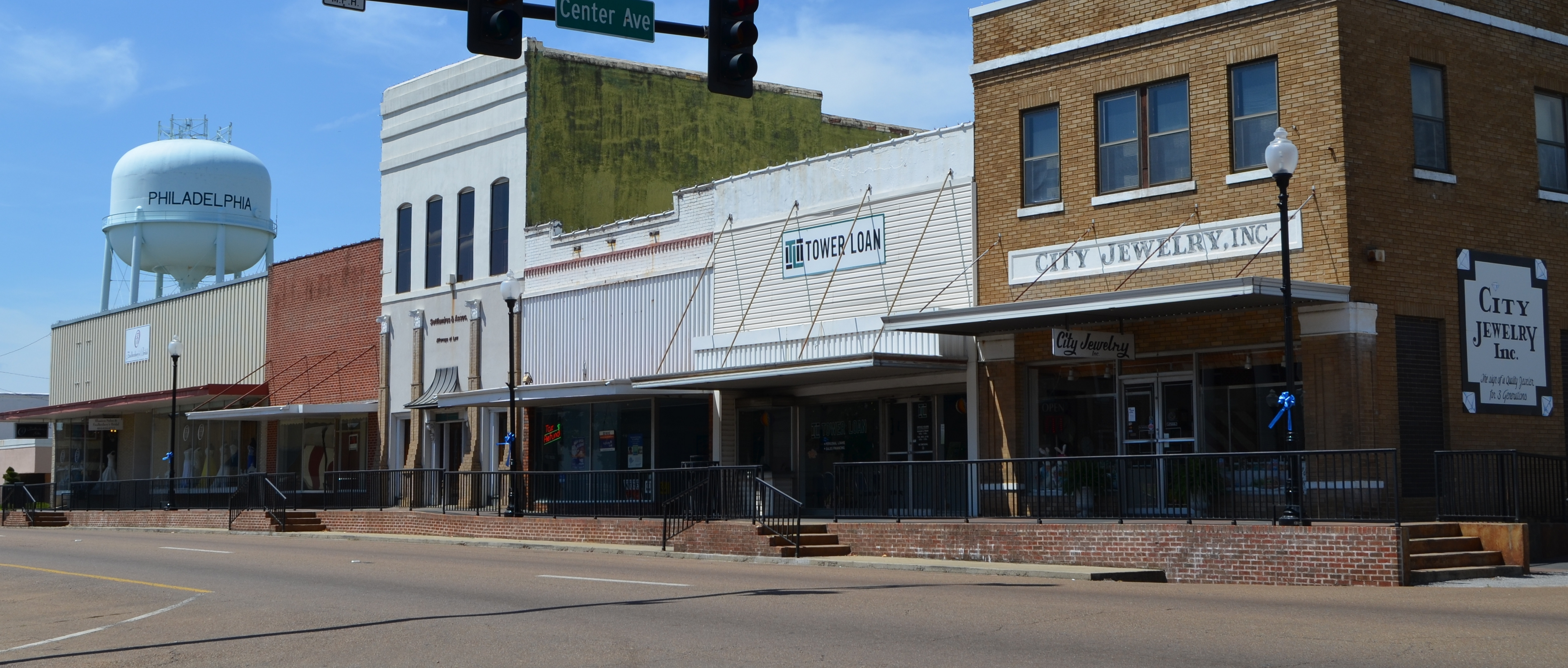
Courthouse Square

Philadelphia is incorporated as a municipality; it was given its current name, after Philadelphia, Pennsylvania, in 1903, two years before the railroad brought new opportunities and prosperity to the town. The history of the town and its influences—social, political and economic—can be seen in the many points of interest within and beyond the city limits. These range from the large ceremonial Indian mound and cave at Nanih Waiya, built approximately 1,700 years ago and sacred to the Choctaw; to the still thriving Williams Brothers Store, a true old-fashioned general store founded in 1907 and featured in National Geographic in 1937 as a source of anything from "horse collars to straw hats."

=== Murders of Chaney, Goodman, and Schwerner ===
In the mid-20th century, Mississippi was a battleground of the civil rights movement as, like other states of the South, it had long disfranchised blacks and subjected them to racial segregation and Jim Crow laws. Philadelphia in June 1964 was the scene of the murders of civil rights workers James Chaney, a 21-year-old black man from Meridian, Mississippi; Andrew Goodman, a 20-year-old Jewish anthropology student from New York City; and Michael Schwerner, a 24-year-old Jewish CORE organizer and former social worker, also from New York. Their deaths demonstrated the risks that civil rights workers took to secure the constitutional rights of African Americans.

Ku Klux Klan members (including Cecil Price, a deputy sheriff of Neshoba County) released the three young men from jail, took them to an isolated spot, and killed them, then buried them in an earthen dam. It was some time after they disappeared before the bodies were discovered, as a result of an FBI investigation and national media attention. The national outrage over their deaths helped procure support for Congressional passage of the Civil Rights Act of 1964 and the Voting Rights Act of 1965. The murders and related conspiracy gave rise to the "Mississippi Burning" trial, United States v. Price.

=== Reagan's visit ===
On August 3, 1980, Ronald Reagan gave his first post-convention speech at the Neshoba County Fair after being officially chosen as the Republican nominee for President of the United States. He said: "I believe in states' rights. ... I believe we have distorted the balance of our government today by giving powers that were never intended to be given in the Constitution to that federal establishment." He went on to promise to "restore to states and local governments the power that properly belongs to them".

=== First black mayor ===
In May 2009, Philadelphia elected its first black mayor, James A. Young, a 53-year-old Pentecostal preacher and a former county supervisor. He defeated Rayburn Waddell, a white, three-term incumbent, by 46 votes in the Democratic primary (there was no Republican challenger). Jim Prince, publisher of the local The Neshoba Democrat newspaper said, "Philadelphia will always be connected to what happened here in 1964, but the fact that Philadelphia, Mississippi, with its notorious past, could elect a black man as mayor, it might be time to quit picking on Philadelphia, Mississippi." Young's campaign staff credited Barack Obama's presidential campaign for increasing registration of black and young voters in Philadelphia, many of whom voted for Young. His term began July 3, 2009. He would serve until 2025, when he lost renomination in the Democratic primary.

=== 2011 tornado ===
On April 27, 2011, part of Philadelphia and surrounding areas were ravaged during the 2011 Super Outbreak when an EF5 tornado with winds of up to 205 mph carved a path through the northern part of town. Despite its incredible strength at the top of the Enhanced-Fujita Scale, only three people died as a result. It would be one of four EF5 tornadoes to strike on that day, and one of two in the state of Mississippi (the town of Smithville further north was decimated a short while later). It also became the first F5/EF5 tornado to strike in Mississippi in 45 years.

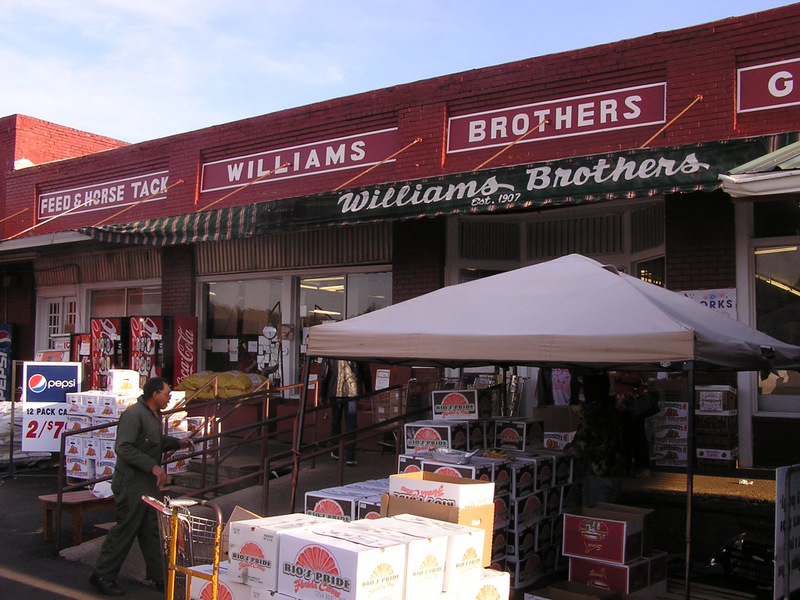
Williams Brothers Store

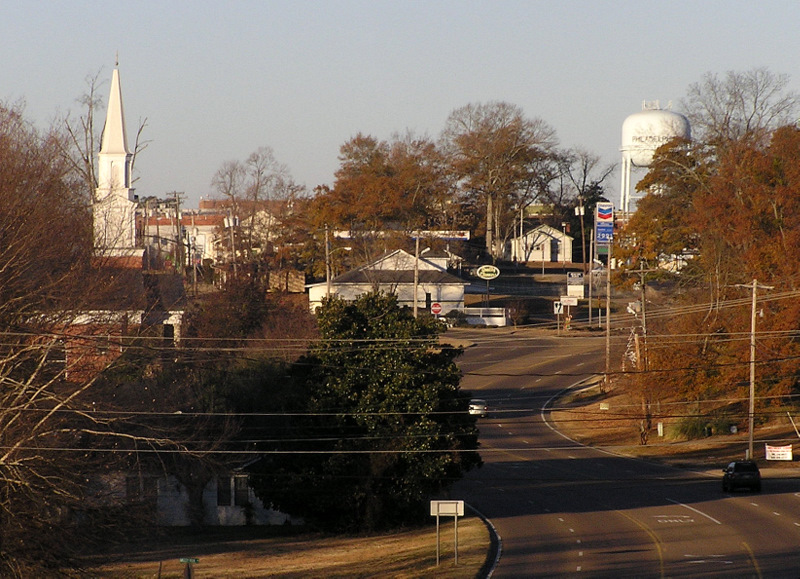
Philadelphia, Mississippi seen from the east end of town.

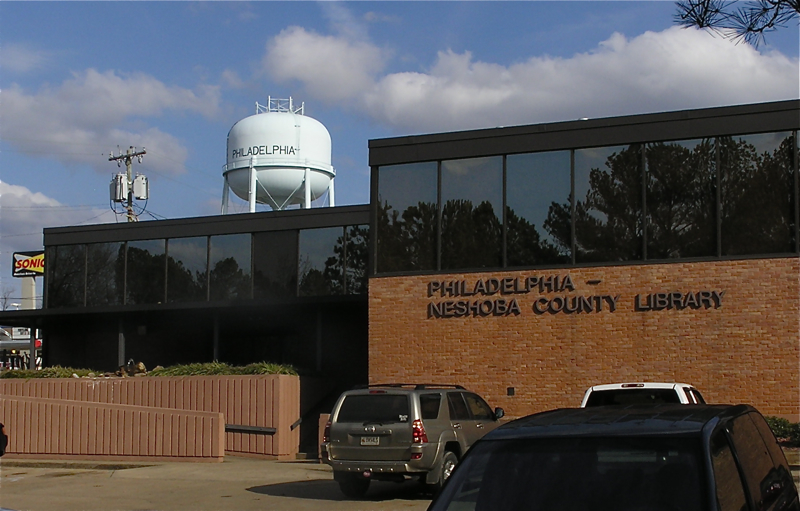
Philadelphia – Neshoba County Library

== Geography ==
Philadelphia is located at 32°46′27″N 89°6′46″W (32.774070, −89.112891).

According to the United States Census Bureau, the city has a total area of 10.6 square miles (27 km^{2}), of which 10.6 square miles (27 km^{2}) are land and 0.04-square-mile (0.10 km^{2}) (0.19%) is water.

=== Climate ===
Philadelphia has a humid subtropical climate (Köppen Cfa) with long, hot summers and short, mild winters.

Climate data for Philadelphia, Mississippi (1991–2020 normals, extremes 1949–2023)
| Month | Jan | Feb | Mar | Apr | May | Jun | Jul | Aug | Sep | Oct | Nov | Dec | Year |
|---|---|---|---|---|---|---|---|---|---|---|---|---|---|
| Record high °F (°C) | 82 (28) | 86 (30) | 89 (32) | 94 (34) | 100 (38) | 103 (39) | 103 (39) | 106 (41) | 105 (41) | 98 (37) | 88 (31) | 84 (29) | 106 (41) |
| Mean maximum °F (°C) | 74.1 (23.4) | 78.3 (25.7) | 83.5 (28.6) | 86.2 (30.1) | 91.3 (32.9) | 95.1 (35.1) | 97.4 (36.3) | 97.6 (36.4) | 95.1 (35.1) | 89.6 (32.0) | 81.3 (27.4) | 75.2 (24.0) | 98.6 (37.0) |
| Mean daily maximum °F (°C) | 55.9 (13.3) | 60.5 (15.8) | 68.4 (20.2) | 75.5 (24.2) | 82.5 (28.1) | 88.9 (31.6) | 91.1 (32.8) | 90.9 (32.7) | 86.8 (30.4) | 77.7 (25.4) | 66.7 (19.3) | 58.5 (14.7) | 75.3 (24.0) |
| Daily mean °F (°C) | 45.5 (7.5) | 49.3 (9.6) | 56.6 (13.7) | 63.7 (17.6) | 71.7 (22.1) | 78.5 (25.8) | 81.1 (27.3) | 80.7 (27.1) | 75.6 (24.2) | 65.1 (18.4) | 54.7 (12.6) | 47.9 (8.8) | 64.2 (17.9) |
| Mean daily minimum °F (°C) | 35.2 (1.8) | 38.1 (3.4) | 44.7 (7.1) | 51.9 (11.1) | 60.8 (16.0) | 68.0 (20.0) | 71.0 (21.7) | 70.4 (21.3) | 64.4 (18.0) | 52.5 (11.4) | 42.6 (5.9) | 37.3 (2.9) | 53.1 (11.7) |
| Mean minimum °F (°C) | 17.4 (−8.1) | 21.7 (−5.7) | 26.7 (−2.9) | 35.1 (1.7) | 44.6 (7.0) | 58.0 (14.4) | 63.8 (17.7) | 62.5 (16.9) | 49.6 (9.8) | 35.0 (1.7) | 26.0 (−3.3) | 21.9 (−5.6) | 15.3 (−9.3) |
| Record low °F (°C) | −3 (−19) | 0 (−18) | 14 (−10) | 27 (−3) | 37 (3) | 42 (6) | 52 (11) | 46 (8) | 35 (2) | 21 (−6) | 11 (−12) | 0 (−18) | −3 (−19) |
| Average precipitation inches (mm) | 5.85 (149) | 5.71 (145) | 5.91 (150) | 5.90 (150) | 4.95 (126) | 4.70 (119) | 5.26 (134) | 4.78 (121) | 3.51 (89) | 4.01 (102) | 4.63 (118) | 5.51 (140) | 60.72 (1,543) |
Source: NOAA(temperatures)(precipitation)

== Demographics ==
Historical population
| Census | Pop. | Note | %± |
|---|---|---|---|
| 1880 | 101 | | — |
| 1910 | 1,209 | | — |
| 1920 | 1,669 | | 38.0% |
| 1930 | 2,560 | | 53.4% |
| 1940 | 3,711 | | 45.0% |
| 1950 | 4,472 | | 20.5% |
| 1960 | 5,017 | | 12.2% |
| 1970 | 6,274 | | 25.1% |
| 1980 | 6,434 | | 2.6% |
| 1990 | 6,758 | | 5.0% |
| 2000 | 7,303 | | 8.1% |
| 2010 | 7,477 | | 2.4% |
| 2020 | 7,118 | | −4.8% |
Source: 1910–2010

=== 2020 census ===
As of the 2020 census, Philadelphia had a population of 7,118, with 2,897 households and 1,804 families. The median age was 39.4 years. 24.7% of residents were under the age of 18 and 18.9% were 65 years of age or older. For every 100 females there were 83.3 males, and for every 100 females age 18 and over there were 77.2 males age 18 and over.

96.1% of residents lived in urban areas, while 3.9% lived in rural areas.

Of the 2,897 households, 33.8% had children under the age of 18 living in them. 30.1% were married-couple households, 18.9% were households with a male householder and no spouse or partner present, and 44.7% were households with a female householder and no spouse or partner present. About 32.7% of all households were made up of individuals, and 15.0% had someone living alone who was 65 years of age or older.

There were 3,306 housing units, of which 12.4% were vacant. The homeowner vacancy rate was 2.4% and the rental vacancy rate was 10.2%.

Racial composition as of the 2020 census
| Race | Number | Percent |
|---|---|---|
| White | 2,924 | 41.1% |
| Black or African American | 3,624 | 50.9% |
| American Indian and Alaska Native | 237 | 3.3% |
| Asian | 55 | 0.8% |
| Native Hawaiian and Other Pacific Islander | 0 | 0.0% |
| Some other race | 62 | 0.9% |
| Two or more races | 216 | 3.0% |
| Hispanic or Latino (of any race) | 134 | 1.9% |

=== 2000 census ===
As of the census of 2000, there were 7,303 people, 2,950 households, and 1,899 families residing in the city. The population density was 688.1 inhabitants per square mile (265.7/km^{2}). There were 3,302 housing units at an average density of 311.1 per square mile (120.1/km^{2}). The racial makeup of the city was 55.54% White, 40.12% African American, 2.01% Native American, 0.49% Asian, 0.08% Pacific Islander, 0.55% from other races, and 1.20% from two or more races. Hispanic or Latino were 1.51% of the population.

There were 2,950 households, out of which 30.4% had children under the age of 18 living with them, 40.8% were married couples living together, 20.4% had a female householder with no husband present, and 35.6% were non-families. 32.5% of all households were made up of individuals, and 15.2% had someone living alone who was 65 years of age or older. The average household size was 2.38 and the average family size was 3.00.

In the city, the population was spread out, with 26.1% under the age of 18, 9.1% from 18 to 24, 25.9% from 25 to 44, 21.0% from 45 to 64, and 17.8% who were 65 years of age or older. The median age was 36 years. For every 100 females, there were 81.4 males. For every 100 females age 18 and over, there were 73.8 males.

The median income for a household in the city was $26,438, and the median income for a family was $30,756. Males had a median income of $30,731 versus $20,735 for females. The per capita income for the city was $15,787. About 25.1% of families and 28.1% of the population were below the poverty line, including 41.1% of those under age 18 and 16.4% of those age 65 or over.

== Government ==
In 2025, Republican councilman Jim Fulton was elected mayor of Philadelphia.

== Arts and culture ==
=== Museums and other points of interest ===
- Geyser Falls Water Theme Park
- Silver Star Casino
- Neshoba County Fair
- Choctaw Indian Fair
- Philadelphia-Neshoba County Museum
- Marty Stuart Congress of Country Music, named for Philadelphia native Marty Stuart

== Education ==
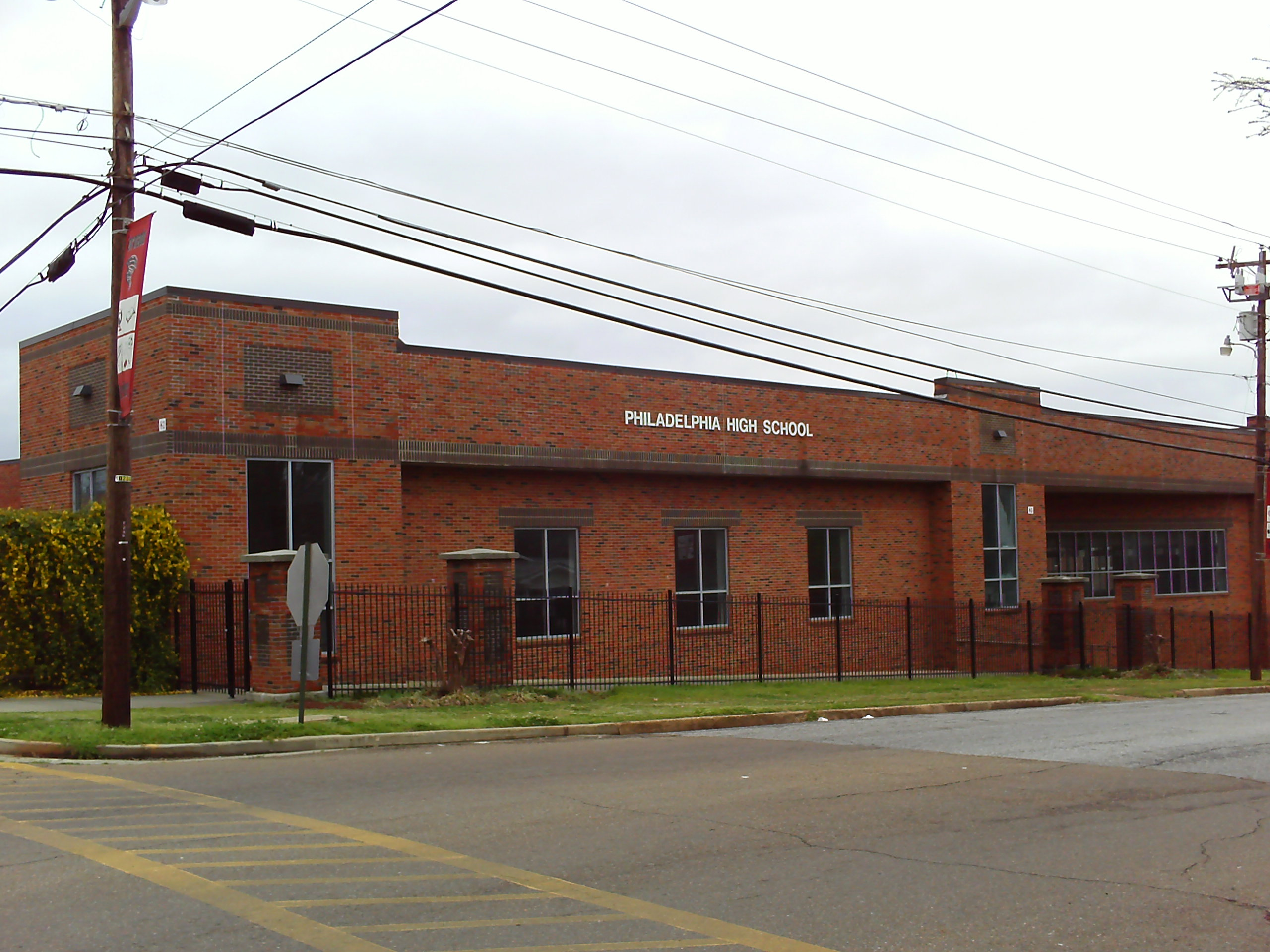
Philadelphia High School

Most of the City of Philadelphia is served by the Philadelphia Public School District and Philadelphia High School. A portion is zoned to the Neshoba County School District and served by Neshoba Central High School.

East Central Community College is the community college of Neshoba County.

== Media ==
The Neshoba Democrat is published in Philadelphia. It is a weekly newspaper that was established in 1881.

== Infrastructure ==
=== Public utilities ===
Cable television services for the city of Philadelphia are contracted to MetroCast Communications. Electrical utilities, as well as water and sewer service, are provided by the City of Philadelphia as Philadelphia Utilities. The natural gas utility is CenterPoint Energy. AT&T is the local telephone service provider.

== Notable people ==
- J. T. "Blondy" Black, former NFL player
- Buck Bounds, member of the Mississippi House of Representatives from 1988 to 1992
- C. Scott Bounds, member of the Mississippi House of Representatives
- Josh Boyd, former NFL defensive tackle
- Jenifer Branning, member of the Mississippi State Senate
- Terry C. Burton, former member of the Mississippi State Senate
- Adam Monroe Byrd, U.S. Congressman and practicing lawyer in Philadelphia, Mississippi
- Billy Cannon, college and pro football player, 1959 Heisman Trophy winner
- Turner Catledge, former editor-in-chief for the Chicago Sun
- William Henry Cook, justice of the Supreme Court of Mississippi from 1920 to 1937
- Mike Dennis, former NFL running back
- Glen Deweese, member of the Mississippi State Senate from 1976 to 1992
- Marcus Dupree, football player in NFL and USFL, also known for building the Mount Nebo Baptist Church in Philadelphia; subject of "The Best That Never Was", an episode in ESPN's 30 for 30 series
- Mike Eakes, former member of the Mississippi House of Representatives
- Tim Edwards, former NFL defensive tackle
- Greg Eiland, NFL offensive guard
- Bob Ferguson, RCA Victor record producer and songwriter, known for his song "Wings of a Dove" that was recorded first by Ferlin Husky in the early 1960s
- Stanley C. Fraizer, professional wrestler better known as Uncle Elmer
- Derek George, singer-songwriter and member of Pearl River
- David Goforth, Major League Baseball pitcher
- Lideatrick Griffin, wide receiver for Mississippi State
- Michael Hardy, country music singer-songwriter who goes by the name HARDY
- Jarquez Hunter, running back for Auburn University
- Iris Kelso, journalist
- Edgar Ray Killen, organized the murders of Chaney, Goodman, and Schwerner
- Florence Mars, civil rights activist
- Phillip Martin, Chief of the Mississippi Band of Choctaw Indians
- Fred McAfee, player for New Orleans Saints and Pittsburgh Steelers, Director of Player Development for Saints
- Shadrick McAfee, former NFL player and former head coach of the Louisiana Swashbucklers
- Dick Molpus, Secretary of State of Mississippi from 1984 to 1996
- Joe H. Mulholland, lawyer and Mississippi state senator
- Devone Payne, head football coach of Northeast Louisiana State Indians from 1954 to 1957
- Lallah Miles Perry, painter and artist
- William Redd, businessman and philanthropist
- Earl S. Richardson, longtime Mississippi state legislator
- Otis Rush, musician in Blues Hall of Fame
- Marty Stuart, country music entertainer, Grand Ole Opry star, and member of the Country Music Hall of Fame.
- Georgia Tann, social worker and child trafficker
- Gloria Williamson, member of the Mississippi Senate from 2000 to 2008
- W. Arthur Winstead, member of the United States House of Representatives from 1943 to 1965
