= Choctaw Nation (disambiguation) =

The Choctaw Nation of Oklahoma is a federally recognized Native American tribal nation.

Choctaw Nation may also refer to:

- Choctaw people, an indigenous ethnic group of the Southeastern Woodlands of North America
- Jena Band of Choctaw Indians, a federally recognized tribe in Louisiana
- Mississippi Band of Choctaw Indians, a federally recognized tribe in Mississippi
- Mississippi Choctaw Indian Federation
