= Phyliss J. Anderson =

American chief

Chief of the Mississippi Band of Choctaw Indians leader
- Preceded by: Beasley Denson

Personal details
- Spouse: Ricky Anderson Sr.
- Children: Three children, four stepchildren, four grandchildren

Phyliss J. Anderson is the first female elected Chief of the Mississippi Band of Choctaw Indians. She succeeded the incumbent Miko, Beasley Denson after the election committee concluded ballot count on July 6, 2011. Anderson polled 1,971 votes to defeat Beasley Denson who polled 1,618.

Phyliss Anderson was sworn in as Chief on July 12, 2011. She is the fourth elected tribal chief of the Mississippi Band of Choctaw Indians subsequent to the tribal government's re-establishment of 1945.

She assumed office at a time when the tribe's most lucrative businesses had come under scrutiny, including an FBI raid on Pearl River Resort and Casino in July 2011, saying financial stability would be her top goal, and pledging to ”not tolerate intimidation, use of fear tactics, and/or threats of jobs."

Anderson is a graduate of Choctaw Central High School and East Central Community College. She was a Choctaw Indian Princess prior to becoming the chief.

In December 2011, she was selected to introduce President Barack Obama at the 3rd Annual White House Tribal Nations Conference.

Acting as Tribal Chief and Chairman of Choctaw Resort Development Enterprise, in February 2012, Anderson signed a 78 million dollar loan package with Trustmark to refinance the Mississippi Choctaw's Pearl River Resort in Choctaw and the Bok Homa Casino in Jones County."

In October 2012, a portrait of Chief Anderson was unveiled at the Mississippi Agriculture and Forestry Museum.

Preceded by Beasley Denson	Tribal Chief of the Mississippi Band of Choctaw Indians; 2011–	Succeeded by
