= Joe Overstreet =

African-American painter

- Born: June 20, 1933; Conehatta, Mississippi
- Died: June 4, 2019 (aged 85); New York, NY
- Known for: Painting

Joe Wesley Overstreet (June 20, 1933 – June 4, 2019) was an African-American painter from Mississippi who lived and worked in New York City for most of his career. In the 1950s and early 1960s he was associated with the Abstract Expressionist movement.

During the Civil Rights Movement of the 1960s, he became known for works such as Strange Fruit and The New Jemima, which reflected his interest in contemporary social issues and the Black Arts Movement. He also worked with Amiri Baraka as the Art Director for the Black Arts Repertory Theatre and School in Harlem, New York. In 1974 he co-founded Kenkeleba House, an East Village gallery and studio. In the 1980s he returned to figuration with his Storyville paintings, which recall the New Orleans jazz scene of the early 1900s. His work draws on a variety of influences, including his own African-American heritage, and has been exhibited in museums and galleries around the world.

== Early life, family, and education ==
Joe Overstreet was born on June 20, 1933, in Conehatta, Mississippi. His father was a mason, whose work exposed him to construction and architecture which was later to influence his three dimensional paintings. His hometown is located in central, rural Mississippi, one of several communities that in 1945 was included in a reservation for the federally recognized Mississippi Band of Choctaw Indians, who made up the majority of the population. Overstreet's family first settled in Conehatta in 1830 and raised trees for wood pulp.

His family was nomadic, moving five times between 1941 and 1946 before settling in Berkeley, CA. In 1951, Overstreet graduated from Oakland Technical High School in Oakland, California, and worked part time for the Merchant Marines. That same year, Overstreet began studying art, first at Contra Costa College and then at the California School of Fine Arts (now the San Francisco Art Institute). He also studied at the California College of Arts and Crafts in 1954. From 1955 to 1957, Overstreet was part of a community of Black artists in Lost Angeles and worked as an animator for Walt Disney Studios.

=== 1950s: From the Bay Area to New York City ===
In the 1950s Overstreet lived in the North Beach section of San Francisco and was a fixture of the Beat Scene. He published a journal titled Beatitudes Magazine from his studio, and was part of a collective of African-American artists. During the early 1950s he exhibited in galleries, teahouses, and jazz clubs throughout the Bay Area, along with young artists such as James Weeks, Nathan Oliveira, and Richard Diebenkorn.

His Grant Street studio was located near that of Sargent Johnson, a sculptor and painter who became a mentor. Johnson believed in the philosophy of Alain Locke, the so-called “father of the Harlem Renaissance” in New York, who advocated for African-American artists to draw from their ancestral legacy for aesthetic sources and inspiration.

In 1958, Overstreet moved to New York City with his friend, Beat poet Bob Kaufman. He designed displays for store windows to earn a living, and lived and had his studio on 85th Street between Columbus and Amsterdam avenues. In New York he met Romare Bearden, who was an inspiration to Overstreet, and he studied painting with Hale Woodruff. He got to know many of the Abstract Expressionist painters from hanging out at Cedar Tavern and felt his real art education came through his relationships with established artists, such as Romare Bearden, Willem de Kooning, Franz Kline, Larry Rivers, Hale A. Woodruff, and Hans Hofmann. He knew Hofmann's work from Berkeley. (“I got more out of the Cedar Street Bar than anywhere…”)

Overstreet said, “Looking at Hofmann reminded me of how I saw things naturally, and looking at Pollock reminded me of how I could do things naturally.” De Kooning gave Overstreet some of his works to sell so that the young painter could make it through difficult times. Overstreet also identified with de Kooning's use of house painter's brushes. He began to feel comfortable using cement trowels to apply his paints, in such works as Big Black (1961).

=== 1960s-1970s ===
In 1962 Overstreet moved downtown and set up his studio at 76 Jefferson Street, in a loft building where jazz musician Eric Dolphy lived. From 1963 to 1973 he lived in the East Village at 186 Bowery where he had a brief marriage to opera singer Elaine Overstreet, his third wife. Elaine birthed Overstreet's third and fourth children. Jahn Frederick Malcolm Overstreet, and Jamahl Woodford Overstreet. From 1970 to 1973 they moved to the East Bay Area where Joe Overstreet taught at the University of California at Hayward. Upon his return to New York in 1974, Overstreet met his wife, artist Corrine Jennings.

== Art and career ==
=== 1950s-1960s ===
Overstreet's early work of the late 1950s to the mid 1960s assimilates his interests in Abstract Expressionism, jazz, and the painful realities of African-American history, in works such as The Hawk, For Horace Silver (1957), Carry Back (1960), Big Black (1961), and Janet (1964).

His painting The New Jemima (1964/1970) (Menil Collection) subverts the stereotypical black image of Aunt Jemima. Unlike the original character, a domestic servant who exists to please others, Overstreet's Jemima wields a machine gun.

Overstreet recalls of this work:

“Larry Rivers saw [the Aunt Jemima painting] around 1970, and he said that if I made it larger, he would include it in the Some American History exhibition at Rice University. So I made a kind of wooden armature so that the painting would resemble something like a pancake box. I enlarged it especially for this art project, which was part of the effort in 1971 to desegregate Rice University. Rice had a codicil that blacks could never attend that institution."

In 1964, Overstreet stopped working with oil and began painting in acrylic, which dries faster. This allowed him to focus more on spatial problems. The painting Strange Fruit (c. 1965) can be seen as a watershed work in terms of its organization and the use of rope, which recurs through the decades in his paintings, in various manifestations. The title Strange Fruit refers to the Billie Holiday rendition of Abel Meeropol's poem and song (first recorded in 1940) about lynchings, in which many black men were killed by hanging.

In particular, the painting may refer to the murders of Chaney, Goodman, and Schwerner, three civil rights workers who disappeared in July 1964 near Philadelphia, Mississippi, not far from Overstreet's home town. They were later found shot and buried in an earthen dam. In this painting, limp trouser legs dangle vertically, with a rope tautly crossing the painting at a diagonal. The abstracted forms suggest charged symbols like a burning cross and Ku Klux Klan hoods.

Other paintings, such as One-Eyed Jack and Masks are also references to the Civil Rights Movement. In this period Overstreet worked with Amiri Baraka as Art Director of the Black Arts Repertory Theatre and School in Harlem and as a set designer. In 1963 Overstreet met Ishmael Reed, the poet, writer, and political activist, just as Reed was formulating his Hoodoo (Haitian voodoo) aesthetic as a literary method.

Overstreet has been explicit about the socio-political content and sources of his work, but he also discusses the ropes and geometry of his paintings in terms of his desire to open up and change space. Overstreet has cited the book by Jay Hambidge, The Elements of Dynamic Symmetry, as a major influence. In the book, Hambidge notes that the Harpedonapte (rope-stretchers) of Egypt discovered the principles of dynamic symmetry and used them to lay out temple plans. Overstreet also recalls his father being interested in the Egyptian rope stretchers, and how masons used rope lines to determine the perspective, pitch and level of the earth.

Admiring the work of Frank Stella, by 1967 Overstreet began working with shaped canvases, that also referred to politically topical issues (Agent Orange and North Star, both 1967). Overstreet also noted his interest in breaking away from western painting, from use of the rectangle and stretcher, and from western art history sources. His sources included the art of North Africa, Islamic mosques, and Mali, and Native American art. Overstreet used wooden dowels shaped with a jigsaw and hand tools to make intricate stretchers, painting figures in patterns drawn from Aztec, Benin, and Egyptian cultures.

In this period he said “I was beginning to look at my art in a different light, not as protest, but as a statement about people. I began to work with the iconography of Native Americans and East Indians, of Oceania and Africa. By 1970 I had broken free from notions that paintings had to be on the wall in rectangular shapes.”

=== 1970s: Flight Pattern series ===
Overstreet's best known work are his shaped paintings from the 1970s. These paintings were no longer on stretchers, instead painted canvas was fitted with grommets, rope was used to attach and suspend them from the exhibition space's walls, floors and ceilings. One of his most important bodies of work are the Flight Pattern series of 1971: tarps of canvas are tethered with ropes to the ceiling and floor. Overstreet notes, “I began to make paintings that were tentlike. I was making nomadic art, and I could roll it up and travel. When I showed them, I rolled them up and took them on a plane.” Power Flight (1971) is in the collection of the Brooklyn Museum.

Overstreet studied nomadic cultures and the idea of a double or foreign identity. He said that he wanted to retain the most appealing feature of nomadic structures: “their tendency, like birds in flight, to take off, to lift up, rather than be held down” by the ropes that suspended them. Many of his 1971 paintings drew from mandala imagery and were icon-like in their presence. Overstreet was interested in tantric yoga, as well as Navajo rituals of sand painting. He said, “Art is about the coming together of expression, cultures crossing…”

“I was trying to create a reflection of what in my past I had felt had run parallel: Native Americans, African nomadic people, black people here who had no homes—there was a lot of homelessness in those years. We had survived with our art by rolling it up and moving it all over. So I made this art you could hang any place. I felt like a nomad myself, with all the insensitivity in America,” Overstreet notes. His work, he says, has been “tied up in abstract shape with what blacks have felt and struggled” over the last four decades.

After the 1971 Flight Pattern series, Overstreet continued his explorations of how paintings could break away from traditional, vertical displays. He suspends tarps from ropes in flexible, three-dimensional installations. His Icarus paintings were fields of stippled color, stretched on bent conduit pipes into convex, soft-edged shapes, suggesting airplane wings. In his Fibonacci series, the structural framework is based on the Fibonacci system of arithmetical progressions (1,1,2,3,5,8,13,21,34).

=== 1980s-2000s ===
In the 1980s, Overstreet worked on a commission to produce a series of 75 steel and neon panels of public art for the San Francisco International Airport.

For decades, Overstreet has experimented with both the spatial and textural possibilities of painting, and also complex cultural histories. He created his semi-figurative Storyville series, which recalls the New Orleans jazz scene and neighborhood of the early 1900s. While exhibiting at the Dakar Biennale in Senegal in 1992, he visited the House of Slaves at Gorée. Later he produced his series known as Door of No Return. Over the next two years he explored the possibilities of paint texture in large, stretched canvas paintings that reflect his interest in sacred geometry.

In his Silver Screens and Meridian Fields of the early 2000s, his interest in transparency led him to paint on steel wire cloth. The dozens of “screen” paintings which Overstreet has made prefigure many of the ways that young contemporary artists are working in the early 21st century. They use fabric, spray paint, and alternative supports to destabilize assumptions and hierarchies of craft, pattern, painting, and modernist art history.

== Galleries: Kenkeleba House and Wilmer Jennings Gallery ==
The Estate of Joe Overstreet is represented by Eric Firestone Gallery.

In 1974, Overstreet, his wife Corrine Jennings, and Samuel C. Floyd established Kenkeleba House at 214 E. 2nd St and, in 1991, a second gallery across the street, Wilmer Jennings Gallery. Both galleries were non-profit spaces that presented exhibitions of work by under-recognized African American artists and artists of color, boasting truly multi-cultural programming. Kenkeleba showed young artists who later found national and international acclaim—among them Rose Piper and David Hammons – and also major historical exhibitions of work by important black painters such as Norman Lewis and Edward Mitchell Bannister.

== Exhibitions ==
=== Group exhibitions ===
- 2017: Soul of a Nation: Art in the Age of Black Power. Tate Modern, London. Traveled to Crystal Bridges Museum of American Art and Brooklyn Museum in 2018.
- 2015: The EY Exhibit: The World Goes Pop. Tate Modern, London.
- 2011: Now Dig This!: Art and Black Los Angeles 1960–1980. Hammer Museum, Los Angeles, CA.
- 2005: Water. Bridgetown Embassy, Barbados. Sponsored by the Art in Embassies Program of the U.S. Department of State.
- 1992-3: A/CROSS CURRENTS: Synthesis in African American Abstract Painting. U.S. Representation: Dakar Biennale, Senegal; IFAN Museum, and National Center for Art; French Cultural Center, Libreville, Gabon; GRAFOLIE Festival, Abidjan, Côte d'Ivoire.
- 1992.4: DREAM SINGERS, STORYTELLERS: An African-American Presence. New Jersey State Museum, Trenton, and venues in Japan: Fukui Fine Arts Museum, Tokushima Modern Art Museum, Otani Memorial Art Museum.
- 1989: The Blues Aesthetic. Washington Project for the Arts; Circulating exhibition.
- 1986: U.S. Art Census, 1986: Contemporary Afro-American Artists. Pennsylvania Academy of Fine Arts, Philadelphia, PA.

=== Solo exhibitions ===
- 2025: Joe Overstreet: Taking Flight. The Menil Collection, Houston, TX.
- 2019: Joe Overstreet, Selected Works: 1975-1982. Eric Firestone Gallery, New York, NY.
- 2018: Joe Overstreet, Innovation of Flight: Paintings 1967-1972. Eric Firestone Gallery, New York, NY.
- 2008: The Storyville Series. City Gallery East, Atlanta, GA.
- 2003: Meridian Fields. Wilmer Jennings Gallery, New York, NY.
- 1996: (Re) Call and Response. Everson Museum, Syracuse, NY.
- 1996: Joe Overstreet: Works from 1957 to 1993. New Jersey State Museum, Trenton, NJ.
- 1965: Hugo Gallery, New York, NY.
- 1955: Vesuvio Cafe, San Francisco, CA.

== Museum collections ==
Overstreet's works of art are included in numerous private and public collections around the world, including the Brooklyn Museum, Mississippi Museum of Art, Rose Art Museum, Rennie Museum, and the Menil Collection.
