= Phillip Martin =

American politician

Miko Phillip Martin
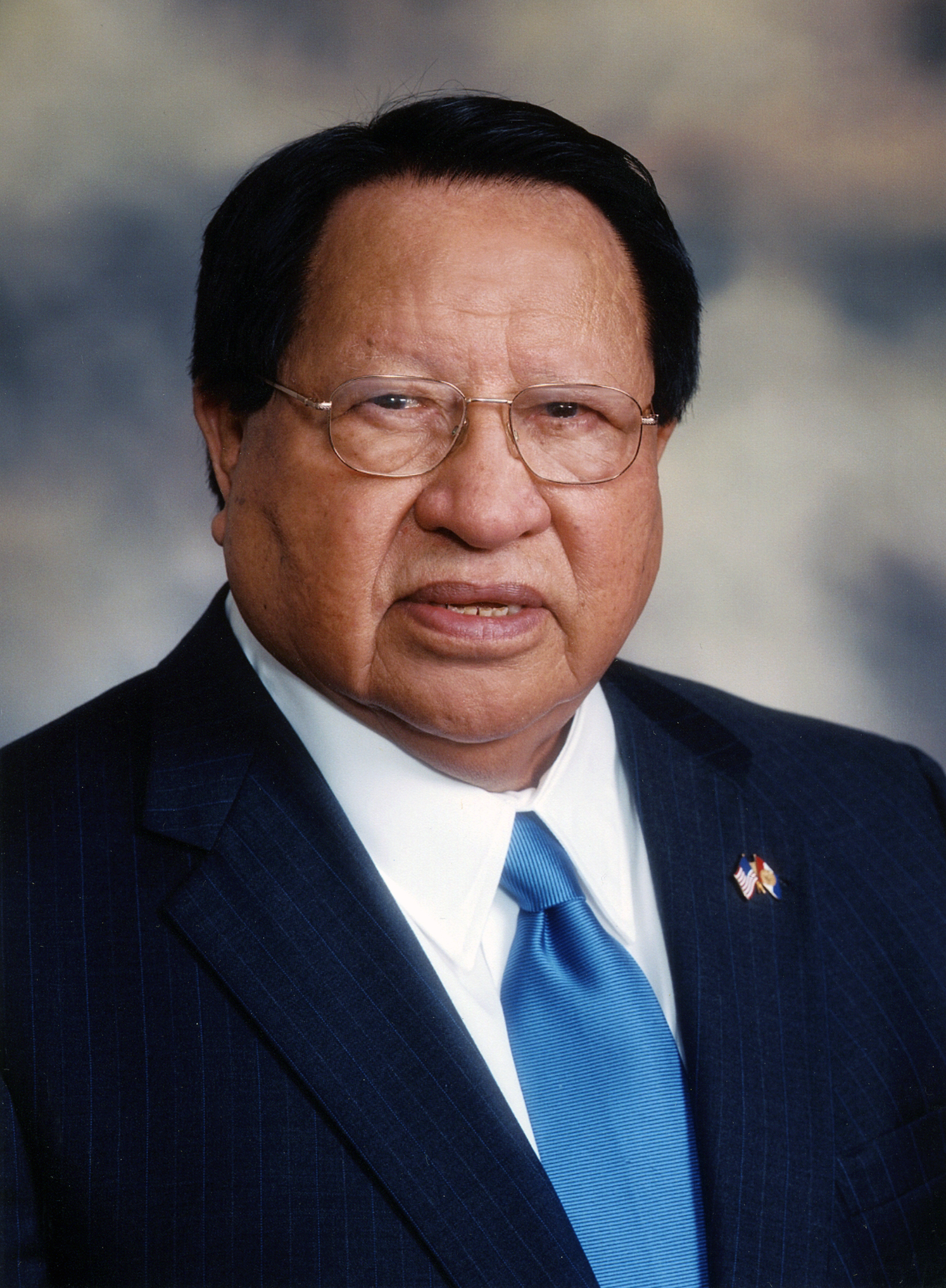
- 2004 portrait

Tribal Chief of the Mississippi Band of Choctaw Indians
- In office 1979–2007
- Preceded by: Calvin Isaac
- Succeeded by: Beasley Denson

Personal details
- Born: March 13, 1926 Philadelphia, Mississippi, US
- Died: February 4, 2010 (aged 83) Jackson, Mississippi, US
- Resting place: Holy Rosary Catholic Church cemetery
- Party: Republican
- Spouse: Bonnie Kate Bell

Military service
- Allegiance: United States of America
- Branch/service: United States Air Force
- Years of service: 1945–1955
- Battles/wars: Occupation of Europe; Korean War

Phillip Martin (March 13, 1926 – February 4, 2010) was a Native American political leader, the democratically elected Tribal Chief (Miko) of the Mississippi Band of Choctaw Indians, a federally recognized tribe in east central Mississippi. Martin had a 40-year record of service to the Tribal government, including 32 years as the Representative of the Tribe's principal elected official. Chief Martin left office in 2007 after the election of Miko Beasley Denson.

== Early life ==
Phillip Martin was born in Philadelphia, Mississippi in 1926, to parents who were Choctaw. He grew up in the culture of his people and attended local schools.

== Career ==
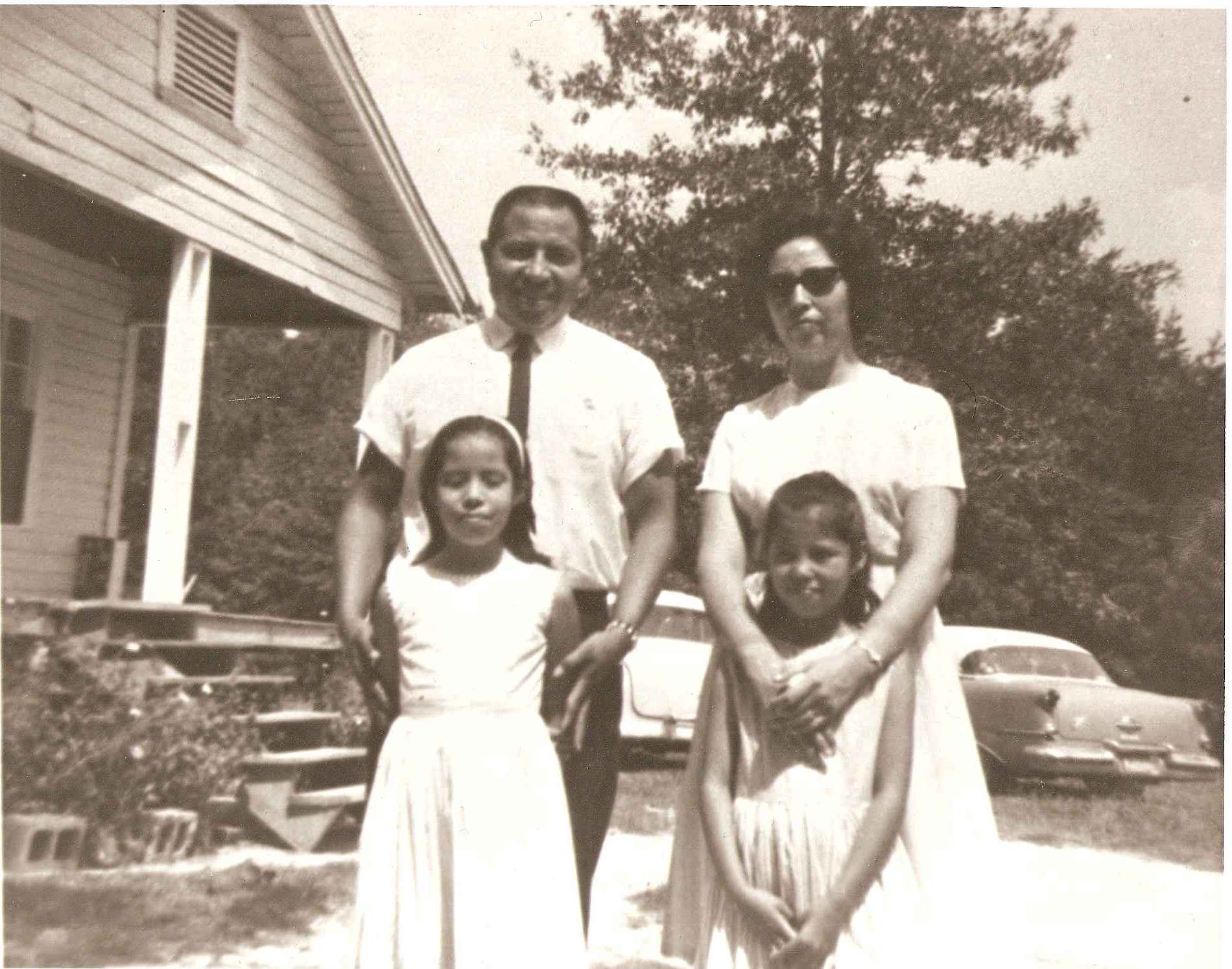
Phillip Martin and family in the late 1950s or early 1960s

After serving in the US Air Force as a sergeant for a decade, Martin returned to his home in Mississippi. He entered tribal leadership in 1957. Martin was first elected tribal chief in 1979.

Nationally, Martin served as president of the National Tribal Chairmen's Association, and in 1969 founded the United South and Eastern Tribes Org (USET), an association of the 23 federally recognized tribes in the eastern portion of the United States. Martin served as founding president of USET and U.S.E.T. Inc. Org. He was the first president of the Board of Regents of Haskell Indian Junior College (now Haskell Indian Nations University), serving from 1970 to 1976. During the Civil Rights Era, Martin advocated integration between Choctaw schools and white schools, and argued that the U.S. government not providing developmental aid to the reservations would serve as "propaganda for the communists".

In that period, Martin worked with other tribal leaders to acquire and maintain accreditation for Haskell, and to improve campus facilities, including construction of dormitories, a cafeteria, resource center, and field house. In 1992, Martin founded the United South and Eastern Tribes Gaming Association. He helped tribes develop gaming facilities on their reservations to generate revenues for tribal welfare, education and income. At the time of his death, the chief presided over the USET Gaming Association.

Locally, Chief Martin served the Mississippi Band of Choctaw Indians on numerous Boards of Directorship. During his tenure as Tribal Chief, Martin is remembered for developing an industrial park on the reservation, and the "$750 million Pearl River Resort, complete with three casinos, two golf clubs and a water park... He was praised for creating thousands of jobs. He also set up a scholarship that pays 100 percent of college costs for tribal youth." Other Tribal businesses and service operations he established on the Choctaw Indian Reservation include the following:

- Pearl River Resort (est. 2000)
- Choctaw Resort Development Enterprise (est. 1999)
- Choctaw Housing Development Enterprise (est. 1995)
- Choctaw Golf Enterprise (est. 1995)
- Silver Star Resort and Casino (est. 1994)
- First American Plastic Molding Enterprise (est. 1993)
- Choctaw Construction Enterprise (est. 1993)
- First American Printing and Direct Mail Enterprise (est. 1990)
- Choctaw Shopping Center (est. 1988)
- Choctaw Residential Center (est. 1987)
- Choctaw Manufacturing Enterprise (est. 1986)
- Chata Enterprise (est. 1979)
- Choctaw Development Enterprise (est. 1969)

He wrote a memoir, Chief: The Autobiography of Phillip Martin. Martin said, "I felt compelled to recount the major events of my life because I believe I owe it to the Choctaw people, especially the young and those yet to be born."

== Death and legacy ==
Martin died on February 4, 2010, in a Jackson, Mississippi hospital after suffering a stroke days earlier.

Preceded by Calvin Isaac	Tribal Chief of the Mississippi Band of Choctaw Indians; 1979 – August 2007	Succeeded by Beasley Denson

== See also ==
- Apuckshunubbee
- Pushmataha
- Mosholatubbee
- Greenwood LeFlore
- List of Choctaw Treaties
