= Conehatta, Mississippi =

- CDP
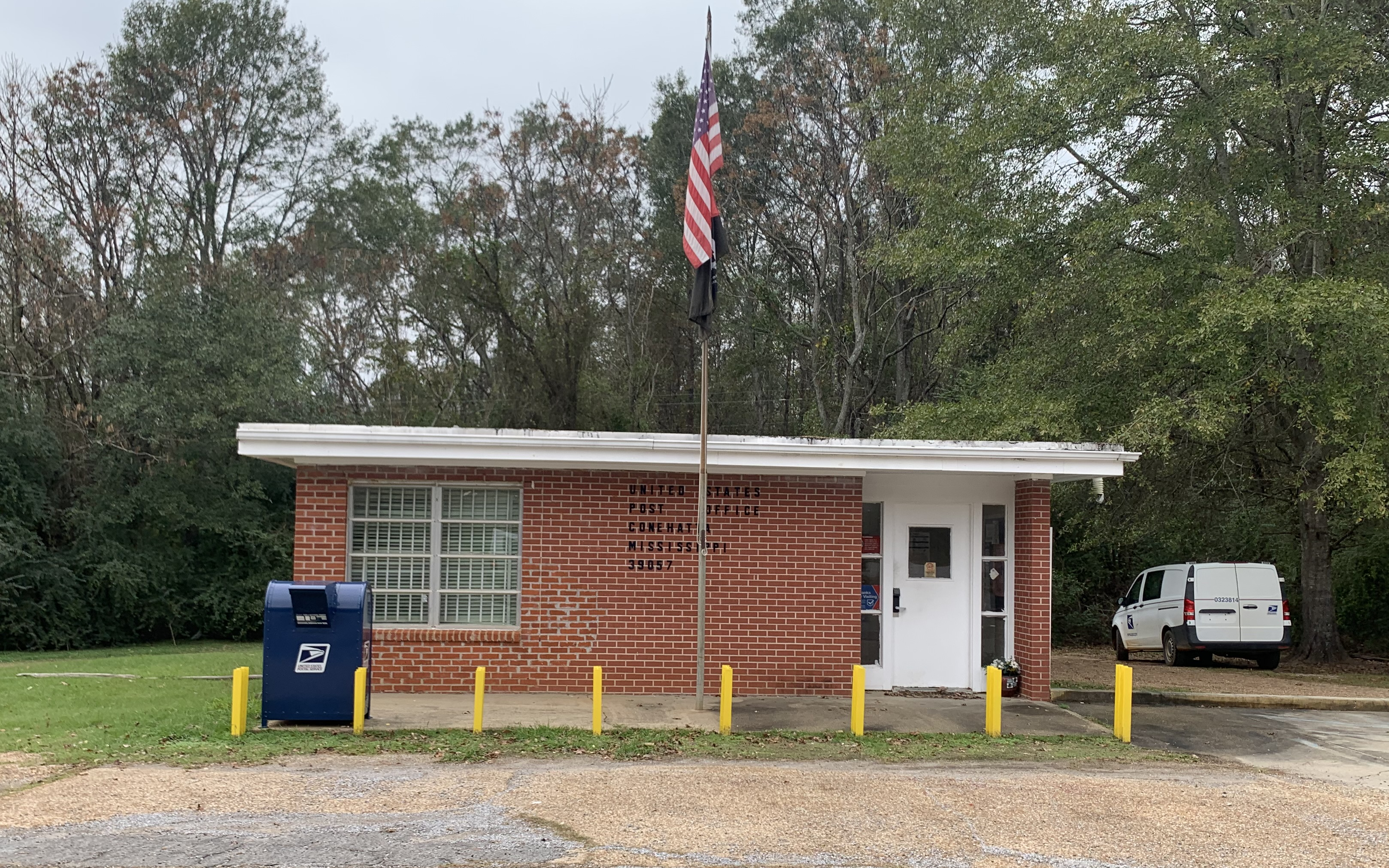
- United States Post Office in Conehatta

- Location of Conehatta, Mississippi
- Coordinates: 32°27′27″N 89°16′16″W
- Country: United States
- State: Mississippi
- County: Newton

Area
  - Total: 15.80 sq mi (40.93 km^{2})
  - Land: 15.70 sq mi (40.65 km^{2})
  - Water: 0.11 sq mi (0.29 km^{2})
- Elevation: 482 ft (147 m)

Population (2020)
  - Total: 1,376
  - Density: 87.7/sq mi (33.85/km^{2})
- Time zone: UTC-6 (Central (CST))
  - Summer (DST): UTC-5 (CDT)
- ZIP code: 39057
- Area code: 601
- FIPS code: 28-15540
- GNIS feature ID: 0668759

Conehatta is a census-designated place (CDP) in Newton County, Mississippi. The population was 1376 at the 2020 census. It is one of the eight communities included in the Mississippi Band of Choctaw Indians Reservation and the population is 76% Choctaw.

The community takes its name from Conehatta Creek.

== Geography ==
Conehatta is located at 32°27′27″N 89°16′16″W (32.457541, -89.271151).

According to the United States Census Bureau, the CDP has a total area of 16.0 square miles (41 km^{2}), of which 15.9 square miles (41 km^{2}) is land and 0.1 square miles (0.26 km^{2}) (0.56%) is water.

== Demographics ==
Historical population
| Census | Pop. | Note | %± |
|---|---|---|---|
| 1990 | 925 | | — |
| 2000 | 997 | | 7.8% |
| 2010 | 1,342 | | 34.6% |
| 2020 | 1,376 | | 2.5% |
U.S. Decennial Census

=== Racial and ethnic composition ===
Conehatta CDP, Mississippi – Racial and ethnic composition Note: the US Census treats Hispanic/Latino as an ethnic category. This table excludes Latinos from the racial categories and assigns them to a separate category. Hispanics/Latinos may be of any race.
| Race / Ethnicity (NH = Non-Hispanic) | Pop 2000 | Pop 2010 | Pop 2020 | % 2000 | % 2010 | % 2020 |
|---|---|---|---|---|---|---|
| White alone (NH) | 156 | 207 | 168 | 15.65% | 15.42% | 12.21% |
| Black or African American alone (NH) | 72 | 85 | 62 | 7.22% | 6.33% | 4.51% |
| Native American or Alaska Native alone (NH) | 753 | 1,003 | 1,082 | 75.53% | 74.74% | 78.63% |
| Asian alone (NH) | 0 | 0 | 1 | 0.00% | 0.00% | 0.07% |
| Native Hawaiian or Pacific Islander alone (NH) | 0 | 0 | 0 | 0.00% | 0.00% | 0.00% |
| Other race alone (NH) | 0 | 0 | 1 | 0.00% | 0.00% | 0.07% |
| Mixed race or Multiracial (NH) | 1 | 16 | 47 | 0.10% | 1.19% | 3.42% |
| Hispanic or Latino (any race) | 15 | 31 | 15 | 1.50% | 2.31% | 1.09% |
| Total | 997 | 1,342 | 1,376 | 100.00% | 100.00% | 100.00% |

=== 2020 census ===
As of the 2020 United States census, there were 1,376 people, 388 households, and 349 families residing in the CDP.

=== 2000 census ===
As of the census of 2000, there were 997 people, 297 households, and 231 families residing in the CDP. The population density was 62.8 inhabitants per square mile (24.2/km^{2}). There were 319 housing units at an average density of 20.1 per square mile (7.8/km^{2}). The racial makeup of the CDP was 16.25% White, 7.22% African American, 76.03% Native American, 0.30% from other races, and 0.20% from two or more races. Hispanic or Latino of any race were 1.50% of the population.

There were 297 households, out of which 50.8% had children under the age of 18 living with them, 37.0% were married couples living together, 32.7% had a female householder with no husband present, and 22.2% were non-families. 18.5% of all households were made up of individuals, and 9.1% had someone living alone who was 65 years of age or older. The average household size was 3.36 and the average family size was 3.68.

In the CDP, the population was spread out, with 40.1% under the age of 18, 12.6% from 18 to 24, 27.4% from 25 to 44, 13.7% from 45 to 64, and 6.1% who were 65 years of age or older. The median age was 24 years. For every 100 females, there were 84.3 males. For every 100 females age 18 and over, there were 81.5 males.

The median income for a household in the CDP was $31,406, and the median income for a family was $24,063. Males had a median income of $25,667 versus $21,719 for females. The per capita income for the CDP was $9,343. About 45.4% of families and 42.1% of the population were below the poverty line, including 50.1% of those under age 18 and none of those age 65 or over.

== Education ==
Conehatta is served by the Newton County School District.

Native American students are eligible to attend schools in the Choctaw Tribal School System, a tribal school system operated by the Mississippi Band of Choctaw Indians, a federally recognized tribe. Conehatta Elementary School is in the community.

== Notable people ==
- Beasley Denson, Tribal chief of the Mississippi Band of Choctaw Indians from 2007 to 2011
- Joe Overstreet (b. 1933, Choctaw), abstract painter
