= Nanih Waiya =

- Nanih Waiya Mound And Village
- U.S. National Register of Historic Places
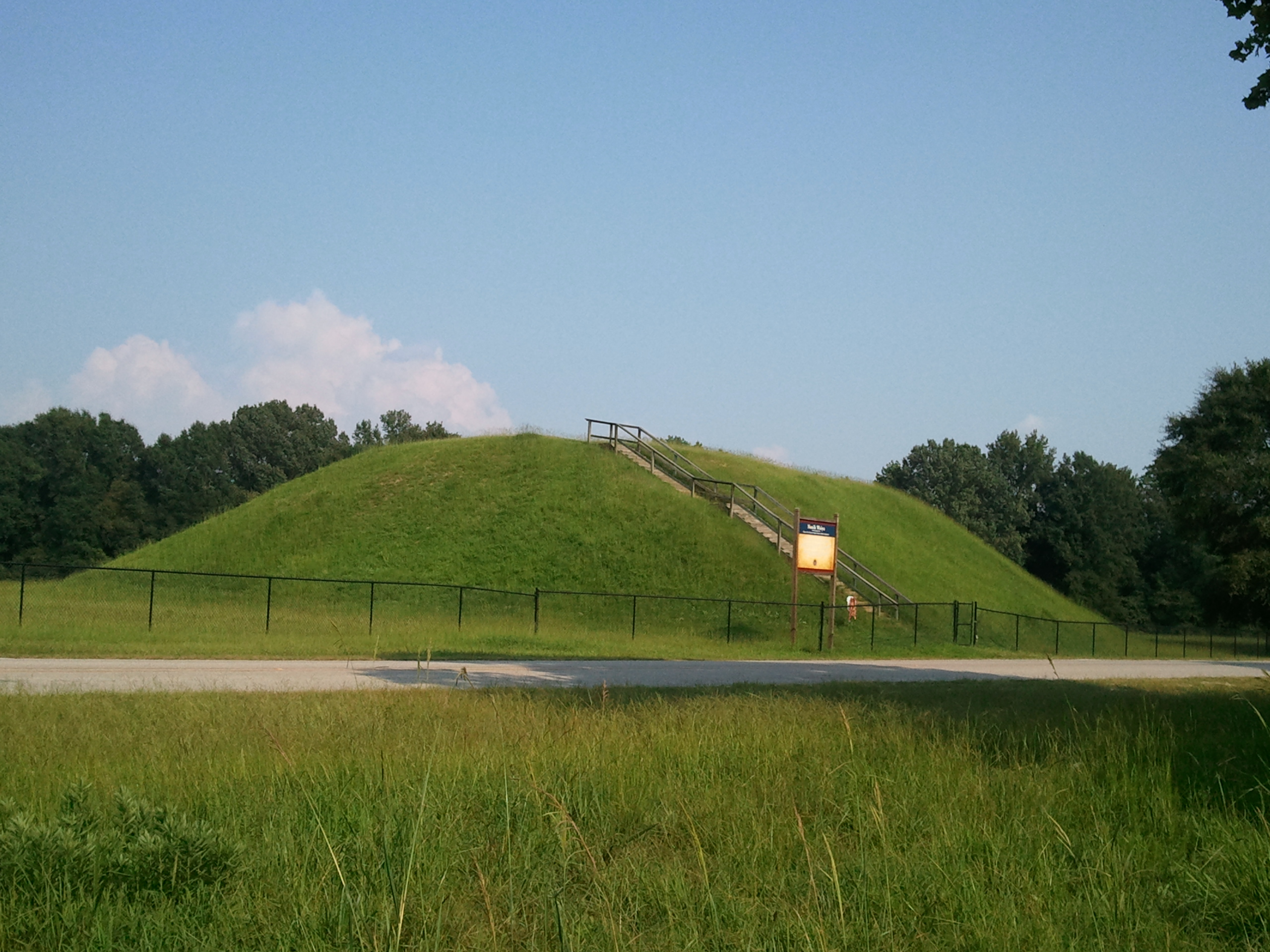

- Location within Mississippi Location within the United States
- Location: Winston County, Mississippi
- Nearest city: Noxapater, Mississippi
- Coordinates: 32°55′17″N 88°56′55″W
- NRHP reference No.: 73001032
- Added to NRHP: March 28, 1973

Nanih Waiya (Note: Choctaw transl. 'slanting mound'. Alternately spelled Nunih Waya, or Nʋnih Waiya by the Oklahoma Choctaw) is an ancient platform mound in southern Winston County, Mississippi, constructed by Indigenous people during the Middle Woodland period, about 300 to 600 CE. Since the 17th century, the Choctaw and Chickasaw have venerated Nanih Waiya mound and a nearby cave as their sacred origin location.

The earthwork mound of Nanih Waiya is about 25 feet (7.6 m) tall, 140 feet (43 m) wide, and 220 feet (67 m) long. Evidence suggests it was originally a larger platform mound, which has eroded into the present shape. At one time, it was bounded on three sides by a circular earthwork enclosure about ten feet tall, which encompassed one square mile. The Choctaw lost control of this property during the 1830s and period of their removal to Indian Territory.

After being privately owned, the state acquired it to preserve the ancient site and operated it as a park. In 2006, the Mississippi Legislature's State Bill 2803 officially returned control of the site to the Luke Family, and T. W. Luke deeded it to the State on the condition that it be maintained as a park.

In 2008, the Luke family deeded control of the site to the Mississippi Band of Choctaw Indians, a federally recognized tribe. Nanih Waiya has been listed on the National Register of Historic Places since 1973 for its significance.

== Archaeological evidence ==
The earliest archaeological evidence of occupation at Nanih Waiya is dated to about 300 to 600 CE during the Middle Woodland, when it was probably built. This makes Nanih Waiya contemporaneous with the Hopewell culture, as well as ancient sites such as the Pinson Mounds in Tennessee and Ingomar Mound in Mississippi. The dating was based on surface artifacts, as no archeological excavation of the mound has ever been undertaken. Its occupation apparently continued at least to 700 CE, in the Late Woodland period.

Archaeologists have not documented any use by the succeeding Mississippian culture, but they suggest that Nanih Waiya has been used for religious purposes throughout its history. The nineteenth-century naturalist and physician Gideon Lincecum recorded a surviving Choctaw oral tradition of their arrival in the area and the construction of the mound.

According to oral history, the Choctaw people had wandered in the wilderness for 42 Green Corn Festivals, through which they carried the bones of their dead, who outnumbered the living. They finally found a leaning hill, where the magical staff indicated they should stay. It was then bountiful land. The tribal council proposed they build a mound of earth to respectfully inter the bones of their ancestors, which they agreed to do. First, they erected a frame of branches. Then these were covered over, and layers of earth were deposited during their domestic tasks. At last, the mound reached great size. When they finished, they celebrated their forty-third Green Corn Festival since wandering in the wilderness. They said that once the main mound had been completed, smaller conical earthen mounds were built and used for single burials.

The mound has been a site of pilgrimage for the Choctaw since the seventeenth century, but they have not held any major festivals there. Their religion was private, and involved rituals related to death and burial, and to communication with spirits. Despite the traditional account, some anthropologists noted that unlike other tribes, the Choctaw do not appear to have practiced the Green Corn ceremony. In the 1850s, observers noted smaller mounds near Nanih Waiya, but these have since been plowed away and were never dated. They may have been constructed by the later Mississippian-culture peoples, who developed a widespread network after the Woodland period. As there is no archaeological data, historical records, nor Choctaw stories of these small mounds, nothing may ever be known about them.

== Cave ==
One mile east, across the county line into Neshoba County of the platform mound, is a natural hill near Nanih Waiya Creek, surrounded by woods. Within this hill, sometimes called Nanih Waiya Cave Mound, is Nanih Waiya cave, considered by many Choctaw to be the site of their emergence onto the surface of the earth. The cave may have had four entrances at one point. In 1973, two cave explorers surveyed the cave and were able to travel 137 feet down. Thirty-five feet from the entrance was water, which deepened as the cavers progressed.

Since the early 21st century, the Mississippi Band of Choctaw Indians have regained control of these sites, acquiring the land by purchase. Under Miko Beasley Denson, the tribe purchased the site in 2008 and began holding annual Nanih Waiya Day celebrations each August with Choctaw foods and dances.

== Choctaw beliefs ==
Some Choctaw believe that Nanih Waiya is the Mother Mound (Inholitopa iski) where the first Choctaw was created. As told by some Choctaw storytellers, it was either from Nanih Waiya or a cave nearby that the Choctaw people emerged to the world. There are many variations of the story.

According to some versions, the mound (or nearby cave) is also the origin of the Chickasaw and Creek people, and possibly even the Cherokee. (Note: As the Cherokee are an Iroquoian-language people (distantly related to the nations of the Iroquois Confederacy formerly based in New York and south of the Great Lakes), anthropologists and historians believe they migrated later than this period into the Southeast. The Cherokee oral history also tells of their migration to the Southeast. They are not considered one of the peoples who coalesced in this region from the Indigenous ancestors who built Nanih Waiya.)

Others believe Nanih Waiya is the location where the Choctaw tribe ceased their wanderings and settled after their origin further to the west. George Catlin's Smithsonian Report in 1885 included a traditional story of the Choctaw that recounted their following a prophet from an origin in the west:

The Choctaws a great many winters ago commenced moving from the country where they then lived, which was a great distance to the west of the great river and the mountains of snow, and they were a great many years on their way. A great medicine man led them the whole way, by going before with a red pole, which he stuck in the ground every night where they encamped. This pole was every morning found leaning to the east, and he told them that they must continue to travel to the east until the pole would stand upright in their encampment, and that there the Great Spirit had directed that they should live.

They say that Nanih Waiya, which means "leaning hill," "stooping hill," or "place of creation" in Choctaw, was the final destination of their migration.

== Preservation ==
During the Indian Removal era, the Choctaw ceded millions of acres of their territory, including Nanih Waiya, to the United States under the Treaty of Dancing Rabbit Creek, drawn up September 15–27, 1830. In the 1840s, the Choctaw Claims Commission of the United States investigated violations of the treaty by U.S. citizens. J.F.H. Claiborne later wrote about the investigations, "Many of the Choctaws examined... regard this mound as the mother, or birth-place of the tribe, and more than one claimant declared that he would not quit the country as long as [Nanih Waiya] remained."

The state of Mississippi preserved Nanih Waiya as a state park for years. It was also recognized as a significant site by the federal government, which listed it on the National Register of Historic Places.

In 2006 the Mississippi Legislature State Bill 2803 officially returned control of the site to the Luke Family, who had privately owned it. T. W. Luke had deeded it to the State with the condition that it be maintained as a park. The 150 acres (61 ha) property reverted to the Luke family when the State stopped maintaining the park.

In August 2008, the Luke family deeded the mound to the Mississippi Band of Choctaw Indians, a federally recognized tribe. The Choctaw have declared August 18 as a tribal holiday to mark the return of the mound, and have used the occasion for telling stories of their origin and history, and performances of dances.

== See also ==
- Nanih Waiya Lake
