= Beasley Denson =

- Occupation: Tribal chief
- Title: Miko
- Predecessor: Phillip Martin
- Successor: Phyliss J. Anderson
- Spouse: Lena Denson

Beasley Denson is a member of the Mississippi Choctaw, who served as Miko or Tribal Chief of the Mississippi Band of Choctaw Indians from 2007 to 2011. He is the third person to be elected as Tribal Chief since the tribe adopted its modern constitution. Beasley Denson defeated 28-year incumbent Phillip Martin by 211 votes, receiving 1,697 votes compared to Martin's 1,486.

== Early life and education ==
Beasley Denson was born in the Conehatta Community as the son of the late David Denson and Bema Steve York. He has two sisters, Angela and Rita, and a brother, Douglas Sam Denson. They grew up in the Standing Pine Community of Choctaw, Mississippi. He is a fluent Choctaw speaker. Denson graduated from Choctaw Central High School and earned an associate degree from Hinds Community College and Mississippi State University.

He married Lena John of Red Water and Pearl River. They have two sons, Michael David and Darren Keith, one daughter, Lane; a son-in-law Oga; and six grandchildren.

== Early career ==
Denson went to work for the Choctaw Tribe, which had reorganized in the first half of the 20th century. Its reservation includes land in several counties in central Mississippi.

== Political career ==
Denson was first elected to the Choctaw Tribal Council in 1975. During his five terms, he served as both Secretary Treasurer and Vice Chief. During this period, Mississippi adopted a gaming law. In 1994 the Choctaw established the first of their two gaming casinos, known as Pearl River Resort. It has generated funds to be used for welfare and economic development.

Denson also served on the Choctaw Gaming Commission for two years. He was an officer on the National Indian Education Board and the Board of Directors for United Southeastern Tribes.

Denson works to be an open and accessible leader; he puts Chahta first. His adherence to this philosophy can be seen across the Reservation. As chief, he made progress reducing the back log of Tribal housing, improving the health care system and upgrading educational facilities.

== Later life ==
Since serving as Chief, Miko Denson serves on the board of the Native American Rights Fund, a non-profit law firm dedicated to defending the rights of Native Americans and Tribes. NARF staff brought the suit in North Dakota in 2016, challenging the state's new photo ID law because it did not accept Tribal cards as identification. A federal court ruled in August 2016 that the law is discriminatory against Native Americans, placing an undue burden on them, and that the state had to allow Native Americans to use former forms of ID for the election in 2016.

Denson is also treasurer of the Sovereign Nations Alliance, a political action committee created to further the legislative goals of Indian Country at the federal level.

== Tribe information ==
The MBCI, with an enrolled membership of 9,660, is the only federally recognized tribe in the State of Mississippi. The Tribe provides a range of government services for its members including schools, a hospital, medical clinics, police and fire protection, courts, an elderly care center and many others. The Choctaw Indian Reservation contains some 35,000 acres (140 km^{2}) of tribal lands situated in ten different Mississippi counties. This land is held in trust for the benefit of the Choctaw Tribe by the federal government. The Tribe has eight officially recognized Choctaw Indian communities: Pearl River, Red Water, Bogue Chitto, Crystal Ridge, Standing Pine, Tucker, Conehatta, and Bogue Homa.

Pearl River, located in Neshoba, is the largest Choctaw Indian community. It is the site of Tribal government headquarters, as well as Pearl River Resort.

| Preceded by Phillip Martin | Tribal Chief of the Mississippi Band of Choctaw Indians; 2007–2011 | Succeeded by Phyliss J. Anderson |
