= Newton County School District =

School district in Mississippi, USA

The Newton County School District is a public school district based in Decatur, Mississippi (USA).

In addition to Decatur, the district also serves the towns of Hickory, Chunky, Little Rock, the community of Conehatta, and much of the Newton County portion of Lake.

== Schools ==
- Newton County High School
- Newton County Elementary School

== Demographics ==
=== 2006–07 school year ===
There were a total of 7000 students enrolled in the Newton County School District during the 2006–2007 school year. The gender makeup of the district was 47% female and 53% male. The racial makeup of the district was 23.88% African American, 72.00% White, 2.54% Native American, 1.32% Hispanic, and 0.26% Asian. 38.2% of the district's students were eligible to receive free lunch.

=== Previous school years ===
School Year	Enrollment	Gender Makeup		Racial Makeup				
School Year	Enrollment	Female	Male	Asian	African American	Hispanic	Native American	White
2005–06	1,893	47%	53%	0.26%	23.98%	1.64%	2.96%	71.16%
2004–05	1,812	47%	53%	0.22%	24.78%	1.49%	2.26%	71.25%
2003–04	1,749	49%	51%	0.11%	26.07%	1.03%	2.12%	70.67%
2002–03	1,726	48%	52%	0.23%	27.11%	1.10%	2.38%	69.18%

== Accountability statistics ==
	2006–07	2005–06	2004–05	2003–04	2002–03
District Accreditation Status	Accredited	Accredited	Accredited	Accredited	Accredited
School Performance Classifications
Level 5 (Superior Performing) Schools	1	1	1	2	0
Level 4 (Exemplary) Schools	1	1	1	0	2
Level 3 (Successful) Schools	0	0	0	0	0
Level 2 (Under Performing) Schools	0	0	0	0	0
Level 1 (Low Performing) Schools	0	0	0	0	0
Not Assigned	0	0	0	0	0

== See also ==
- List of school districts in Mississippi
