= Redwater, Mississippi =

- Census-designated place
- Location of Redwater, Mississippi

- Location in the United States
- Coordinates: 32°46′37″N 89°32′37″W
- Country: United States
- State: Mississippi
- County: Leake

Area
  - Total: 10.53 sq mi (27.27 km^{2})
  - Land: 10.51 sq mi (27.23 km^{2})
  - Water: 0.019 sq mi (0.05 km^{2})
- Elevation: 390 ft (119 m)

Population (2020)
  - Total: 683
  - Density: 65.0/sq mi (25.08/km^{2})
- Time zone: UTC-6 (Central (CST))
  - Summer (DST): UTC-5 (CDT)
- FIPS code: 28-61400
- GNIS feature ID: 0676553

Redwater is a census-designated place (CDP) in Leake County, Mississippi, United States. It is one of the eight communities of the Mississippi Band of Choctaw Indians Reservation, and the population is 61% Choctaw. As of the 2020 census, Redwater had a population of 683.

== Geography ==
Redwater is located in central Leake County at 32°46′37″N 89°32′37″W (32.777025, -89.543724). It is bordered to the south by the city of Carthage, the county seat. Mississippi Highway 25 passes through the CDP, leading northeast 40 miles (64 km) to Louisville and southwest 55 miles (89 km) to Jackson, the state capital. Mississippi Highway 35 crosses Highway 25, leading north 20 miles (32 km) to Kosciusko and south through Carthage 31 miles (50 km) to Interstate 20 at Forest.

According to the United States Census Bureau, the Redwater CDP has a total area of 10.5 square miles (27.3 km^{2}), of which 0.02 square miles (0.05 km^{2}), or 0.17%, are water. Town Creek, a tributary of the Pearl River, flows southward through the center of the CDP.

== Demographics ==
Historical population
Census	Pop.	Note	%±
2000	409		—
2010	633		54.8%
2020	683		7.9%
U.S. Decennial Census

=== 2020 census ===
Redwater racial composition (NH = Non-Hispanic) (Note: Note: the US Census treats Hispanic/Latino as an ethnic category. This table excludes Latinos from the racial categories and assigns them to a separate category. Hispanics/Latinos can be of any race.)
Race	Number	Percentage
White (NH)	56	8.2%
Black or African American (NH)	125	18.3%
Native American or Alaska Native (NH)	463	67.79%
Asian (NH)	1	0.15%
Mixed/Multi-Racial (NH)	18	2.64%
Hispanic or Latino	20	2.93%
Total	683	

As of the 2020 United States census, there were 683 people, 330 households, and 219 families residing in the CDP.

=== 2000 census ===
As of the census of 2000, there were 409 people, 125 households, and 95 families residing in the CDP. The population density was 39.6 inhabitants per square mile (15.3/km^{2}). There were 140 housing units at an average density of 13.6/sq mi (5.2/km^{2}). The racial makeup of the CDP was 10.51% White, 12.47% African American, 76.53% Native American, 0.24% from other races, and 0.24% from two or more races. Hispanic or Latino of any race were 1.22% of the population.

There were 125 households, out of which 39.2% had children under the age of 18 living with them, 33.6% were married couples living together, 36.0% had a female householder with no husband present, and 24.0% were non-families. 18.4% of all households were made up of individuals, and 8.8% had someone living alone who was 65 years of age or older. The average household size was 3.27 and the average family size was 3.64.

In the CDP, the population was spread out, with 37.9% under the age of 18, 10.5% from 18 to 24, 25.9% from 25 to 44, 18.1% from 45 to 64, and 7.6% who were 65 years of age or older. The median age was 26 years. For every 100 females, there were 97.6 males. For every 100 females age 18 and over, there were 84.1 males.

The median income for a household in the CDP was $16,333, and the median income for a family was $13,542. Males had a median income of $25,667 versus $17,500 for females. The per capita income for the CDP was $8,835. About 50.5% of families and 53.5% of the population were below the poverty line, including 58.4% of those under age 18 and 55.4% of those age 65 or over.

== Education ==
Redwater is served by the Leake County School District.

Native American students are eligible to attend schools in the Choctaw Tribal School System, a tribal school system operated by the Mississippi Band of Choctaw Indians. Red Water Elementary School is in the community.

East Central Community College covers Leake County.
