= Powtawche Valerino =

American mechanical engineer

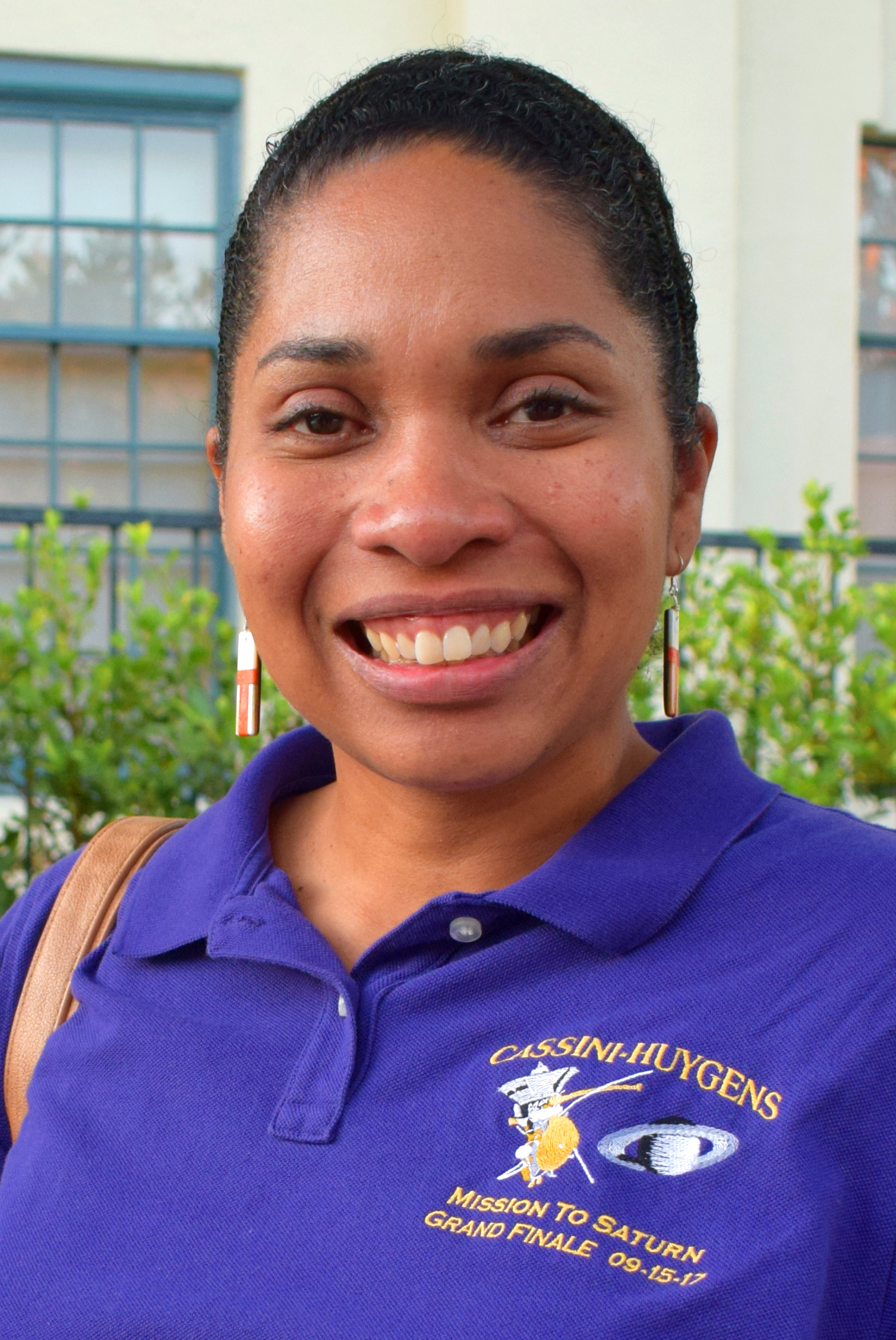
- Valerino in 2017
- Born: New Orleans, Louisiana
- Education: Rice University; Stanford University
- Occupation: Engineer
- Known for: mechanical engineering community outreach
- Awards: National Association for the Advancement of Colored People Education Award (2016)
- Scientific career
- Workplaces: NASA Jet Propulsion Laboratory
- Thesis: Optimizing Interplanetary Trajectories to Mars via Electrical Propulsion (2005)

Powtawche N. Valerino is an American mechanical engineer at the NASA Jet Propulsion Laboratory. She worked as a navigation engineer for the Cassini mission.

== Early life and education ==
Valerino was born to a Mississippi Choctaw mother and African-American father. She grew up on the Mississippi Choctaw reservation and is an enrolled member of the tribe. When she was ten, she moved with her family to New Orleans. A few years later she saw the Space Shuttle Challenger explosion on television and became interested in science. Valerino learned cello at age twelve, and still plays in the Pasadena Community Orchestra. During high school, Valerino interned as a mechanical engineer as part of NASA's Summer High School Apprenticeship Research Program, where highly achieving students shadow NASA professionals.

She obtained a bachelor's degree in mechanical engineering from Stanford University, and received her master's degree and doctoral degrees in Mechanical Engineering with a specialty in Aero-Astronautics from Rice University. During summers at graduate school, Valerino interned at Johnson Space Center in Houston and Stennis Space Center in Hancock County, Mississippi, where she worked on the X-38 vehicle (International Space Station lifeboat) team. Her dissertation, Optimizing Interplanetary Trajectories to Mars via Electrical Propulsion, was submitted to Rice in 2005. She was the first Native American to earn a PhD in engineering at Rice University.

== Research and career ==
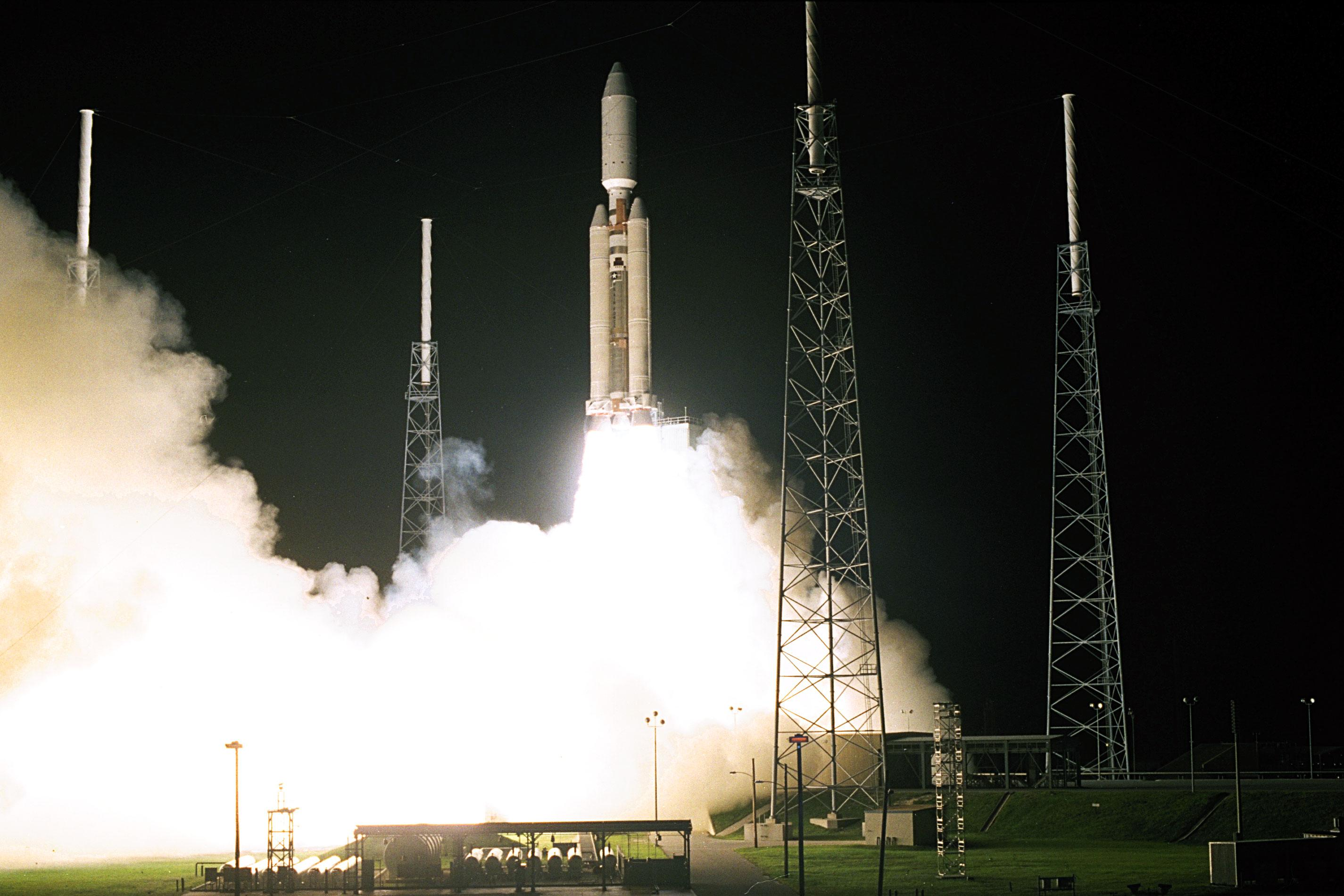
Cassini-Huygens lifted off with a Titan 4(01)B from Launch Complex 40.

Valerino joined the Jet Propulsion Laboratory's Mission Design and Navigation Section in 2005. She first worked on the proposed Jupiter Icy Moon Orbiter mission, then transferred to the Cassini mission, where she was a navigator with the maneuver and trajectory team. The Cassini mission far outlived the predicted four-year lifetime, with engineers like Valerino pushing it to thirteen years. Throughout the Cassini mission, Valerino shared the spacecraft status and findings with the public.

Her most recent project was the Parker Solar Probe spacecraft, which launched on August 12, 2018. It became the first satellite to fly as close to the sun as Helios 2 did in 1976.

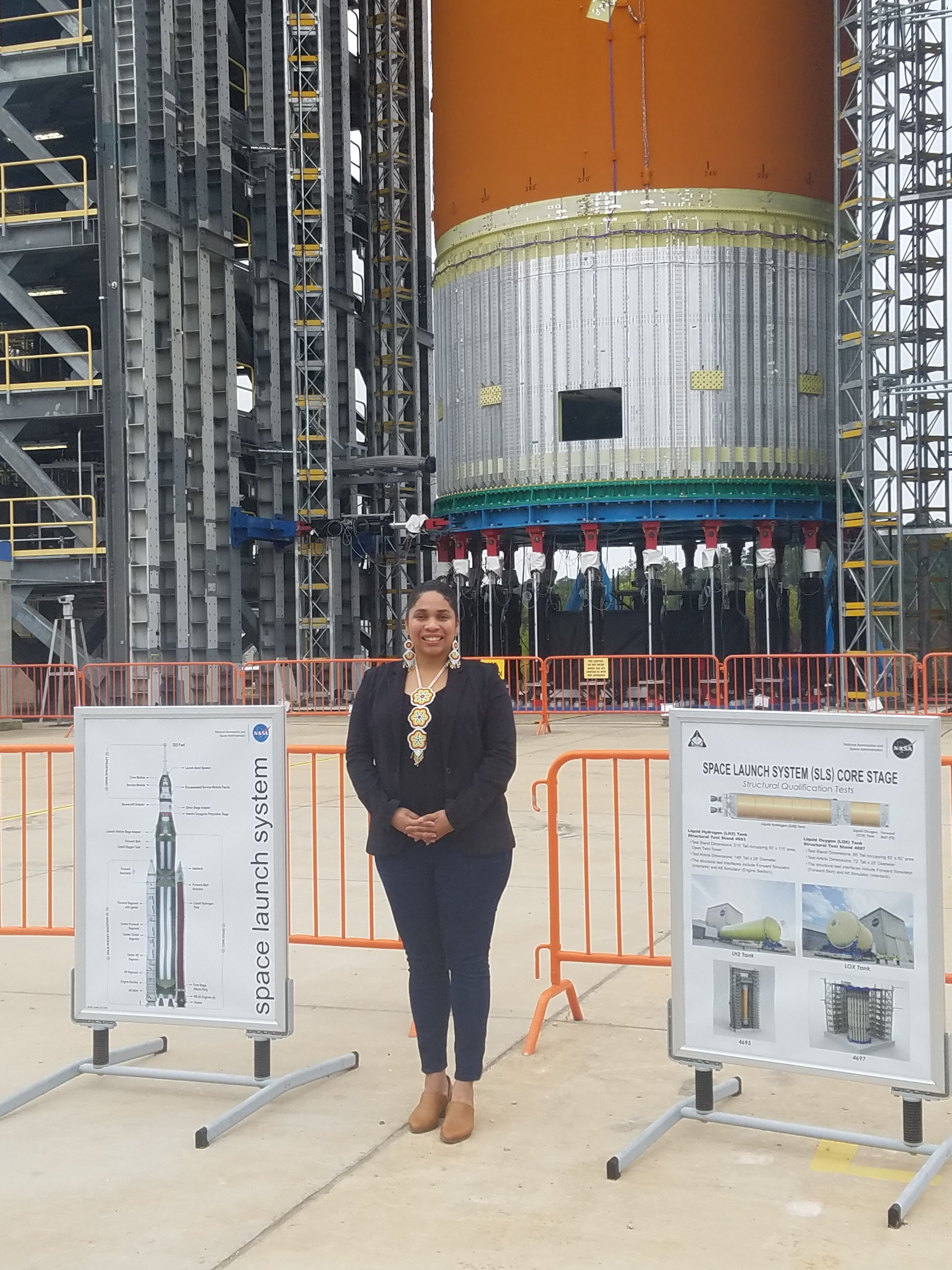
Valerino at the site of NASA's Space Launch System program.

== Public engagement ==
Valerino has worked to recruit and encourage the participation of under-represented groups in science. This has included working with Soledad O'Brien to encourage black and Latina young women to pursue careers in STEM at the PowHERful Summit. In 2016 she received the National Association for the Advancement of Colored People Education Award for her outreach activities. In 2017, Valerino joined 21st Century Fox in their promotion of the film Hidden Figures, which tells of the role of outstanding African-American mathematicians and scientists in the Apollo program.

Valerino is a fan of comic books. She has also discussed strong women in graphic novels on podcasts.

== Selected publications ==
- Juan Arrieta, Christopher G. Ballard, Yungsun Hahn, Paul W. Stumpf, Powtawche N. Valerino, Sean V. Wagner. 2012. Cassini Solstice Mission Maneuver Experience: Year Two. AIAA/AAS Astrodynamics Specialist Conference. doi:10.2514/6.2012-4433
- Sean V. Wagner, Juan Arrieta, Yungsun Hahn, Paul W. Stumpf, Powtawche N. Valerino, and Mau C. Wong. (Preprint) AAS 13-717 Cassini Solstice Mission Maneuver Experience: Year Three. trs.jpl.nasa.gov (preprint).
- Powtawche N. Valerino, Brent Buffington, Kevin Criddle, Yungsun Hahn, Rodica Ionasescu, Julie A. Kangas, Tomas Martin-Mur, Ralph B. Roncoli and Jon A. Sims. 2014. Preliminary Maneuver Analysis for the Europa Clipper Multiple-Flyby Mission. AIAA/AAS Astrodynamics Specialist Conference. doi:10.2514/6.2014-4461.
