= Choctaw, Neshoba County, Mississippi =

Unincorporated community in Neshoba County, Mississippi, United States

Choctaw, Mississippi
- Unincorporated community
- Location within Mississippi Location within the United States
- Coordinates: 32°46′41″N 89°06′02″W
- Country: United States
- State: Mississippi
- County: Neshoba
- Elevation: 410 ft (120 m)
- Time zone: UTC-6 (Central (CST))
  - Summer (DST): UTC-5 (CDT)
- ZIP code: 39350
- Area code: 601
- GNIS feature ID: 685014

Choctaw is an unincorporated community and Indian reservation in Neshoba County, Mississippi, United States.

== Description ==
Choctaw is approximately 5.3 miles (8.5 km) west of Philadelphia along Mississippi Highway 16. It is the home of the Mississippi Band of Choctaw Indians, the only federally recognized Indian tribe in Mississippi.

The Choctaw have developed several resorts and attractions on their reservation, including the Pearl River Resort (comprising the Silverstar and Golden Moon casinos), Dancing Rabbit Golf Club, Geyser Falls Water Theme Park, and Lake Pushmataha. This 285 acres (1.15 km^{2}) fishing and recreation reservoir opened to the public in 2005.
