= Lake Pushmataha =

- Location within Mississippi Location within the United States
- Location: Neshoba County, Mississippi
- Coordinates: 32°47′50″N 89°14′40″W
- Type: reservoir
- Etymology: Pushmataha
- Surface area: 285-acre (115 ha)

Lake Pushmataha is a 285-acre (115 ha) reservoir in the U.S. state of Mississippi.

Lake Pushmataha was named after Pushmataha, a Choctaw chieftain.
