= Conehatta Creek =

Stream in Mississippi, United States

Coordinates: 32.4115312°N 89.2947854°W

Conehatta Creek is a stream in the U.S. state of Mississippi.

Conehatta is a name derived from the Choctaw language purported to mean "white polecat".
