= Mississippi Choctaw Indian Federation =

Organization of Choctaws

The Mississippi Choctaw Indian Federation was an organization of Choctaws and a former rival governing body of the Mississippi Band of Choctaw Indians. They opposed federal tribal recognition because of fears of dominance by the Bureau of Indian Affairs (BIA) and were never federally recognized. Nevertheless, they were considered a legitimate parallel government.

== History ==
The Federation was formed on September 27, 1934. Reverend Ed Willis was installed as the first recognized chief. The group represented 400 Choctaw and had a functioning, written constitution.

The government disbanded after leaders were moved to another jurisdiction.
