= Jena Band of Choctaw Indians =

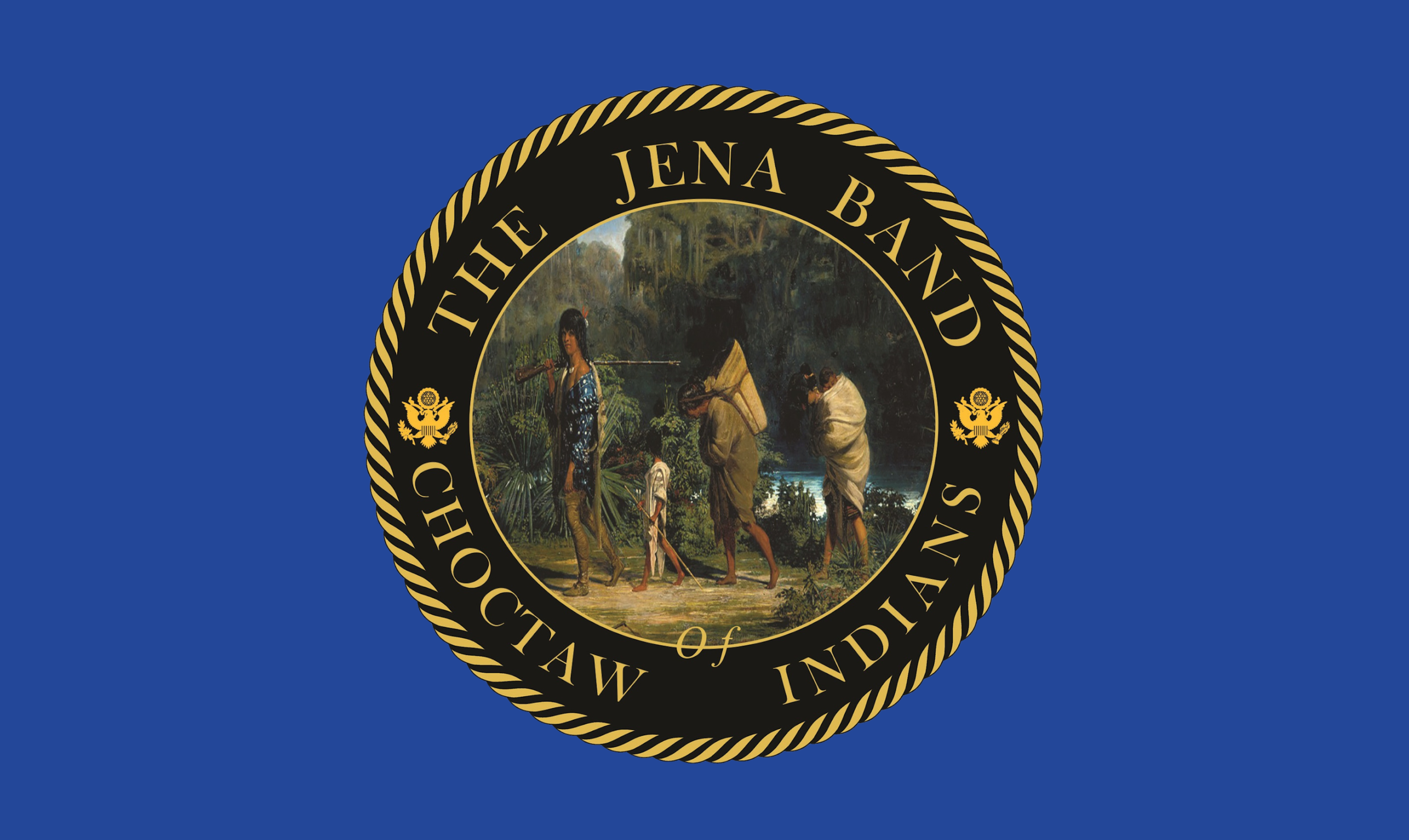
- flag

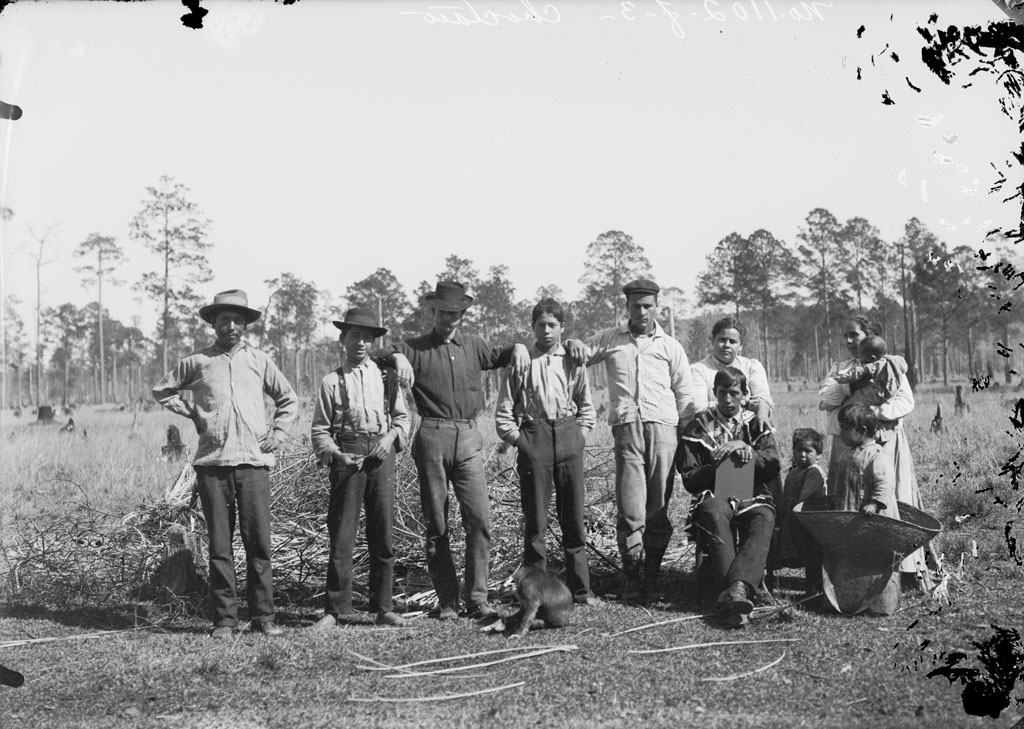
- Eastern Choctaw

Total population
- 327

Regions with significant populations
- United States (Louisiana)

Languages
- English, Choctaw

Religion
- Christianity, Choctaw religion

Related ethnic groups
- Other Choctaw tribes, Muscogee (Creek), Chickasaw, Seminole, Cherokee

The Jena Band of Choctaw Indians (Choctaw: Jena Chahta) are one of three federally recognized Choctaw tribes in the United States. They are based in La Salle, Catahoula, and Grant parishes in the U.S. state of Louisiana. The Jena Band received federal recognition in 1995 and has a reservation in Grant Parish. Their headquarters are in Jena, Louisiana. Tribal membership totals 327.

== History ==
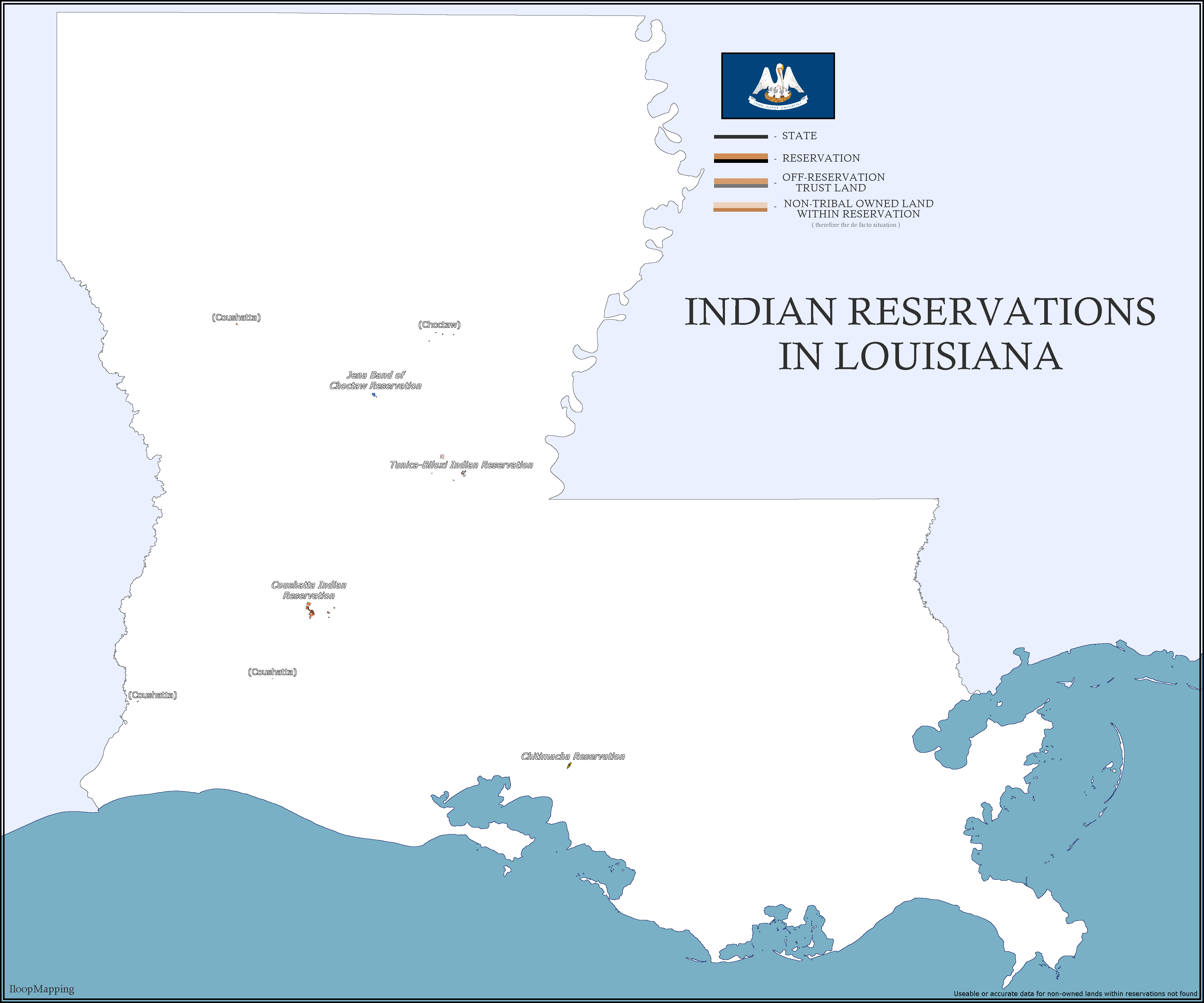
Map of the Jena Band of Choctaw Indians and neighboring tribes.

The Jena Band of Choctaw Indians are related to the federally recognized Mississippi Band of Choctaw Indians. Both bands descend from Choctaws that remained behind in Mississippi when the Choctaw Nation was removed to Indian Territory in the 1830s after signing the Treaty of Dancing Rabbit Creek. Between 1870 and 1880, ancestors of the Jena Band left Mississippi and settled in central Louisiana.

Ten core families with surnames that included Lewis, Allen, Gibson, and Jackson came to reside on plantations owned by the Bowie and Whatley families near Jena, Louisiana. Most worked as sharecroppers, domestics, or day laborers. The Bowie and Whatley families and the Choctaw group developed a dependent and paternalistic relationship. This was evident in how the local community referred to the band members as the "Bowie Indians" or the "Whatley Indians." Many Choctaws were forced to buy goods on credit at the Whatley family store on their plantation. The Choctaws also grew gardens for their own subsistence. Choctaw men tanned deer hides; women made baskets for sale.

The original ten families were known as "full-blood" Choctaws in the local area. The Jena Band was isolated on Whatley and Bowie lands until the 1950s. Due to discrimination and the Choctaw's determination to maintain their community, they had limited contact with the white population in the area. Members of the group spoke Choctaw and maintained Choctaw names. John Allen, for example, was also known by his traditional name, Hatubbe. Jena Choctaws largely intermarried within the small group until the 1950s.

They maintained Choctaw traditions such as language and folklore. Some members traveled to Muskogee, Indian Territory, in 1902 to appear before the Dawes Commission. Their testimony revealed that most Jena Choctaw applicants were monolingual in Choctaw. In the 1930s, sources reported that most group members spoke Choctaw and no English.

Until the 1930s, the small Jena Choctaw group received no assistance from the Bureau of Indian Affairs (BIA). As part of President Franklin Roosevelt's "Indian New Deal," federal officials sought to aid non-federally recognized tribes in the Southeast that had maintained significant indigenous ancestry and community cohesion. The BIA established a school for Jena Choctaw children during the decade.

The first teacher noted that the children could not speak English and urgently needed educational assistance. Because of the Jena Choctaw band's small size, poverty, and isolation, federal officials planned to remove the families to the Mississippi Band of Choctaw Indians Reservation in the late 1930s. Funding shortages hampered this effort.

By the 1960s, many Choctaws had moved away from Jena to take jobs in growing urban areas such as New Orleans and Houston. However, the core Jena Choctaw community remained on lands near Jena. During that time, Jena Choctaws generally avoided the growing Indian activism in Louisiana and other Southeastern states. It was customary for the Band to pass the traditional leadership on to the oldest male in the community, but the last traditional leader, William Lewis, died in 1968.

Also, in 1968, the younger Jena Choctaws began advocating for economic change and acknowledgment of their rights as indigenous Americans. An outgrowth of the Indian renaissance of the era, the newly created Louisiana Governor's Office on Indian Affairs sought to organize the band. In the early 1970s, it helped younger Jena Choctaw leaders write a formal constitution.

It set up formal government structures and electoral procedures while establishing specific criteria for tribal membership for the first time, requiring a one-quarter Choctaw blood quantum for enrollment (later changed to 1/32 Choctaw blood). In 1974, Jerry Jackson was elected the Jena Band's first Chairman. With a federal Department of Housing and Urban Development (HUD) grant, the Band built a tribal center.

In the early 1980s, they also received a federal grant from the Administration for Native Americans to research and write a petition for federal tribal recognition through the BIA's Federal Acknowledgment Process. The Band also pursued tribal recognition legislation after 1980. In 1995, the federal government acknowledged the Jena Band as a federally-recognized tribe through the Bureau of Indian Affairs' process.

After 15 years of planning, construction began on the Jena Choctaw Pines Casino, located in the newly incorporated Town of Creola, Louisiana. The doors were opened in 2013.

== Government ==
The tribe is headquartered in Jena, Louisiana.

When the tribe was first federally recognized in 1995, it was governed by a five-member council, which included Tribal Chief Jerry Don Jackson and Tribal Council members Mary Jones, Christine Norris, Ricky Jackson, and Cheryl Smith.

Smith was elected as the Jena Band of Choctaw Indian’s first woman chief in 1998 and served in that capacity until 2002 and was re-elected in 2010. She served on the Tribal Council from 1975 to 1998 and 2004 to 2010. She retired on October 20, 2022.

In 2024, the elected Principal Chief of the Jena Band is Libby Rogers.

== Reservation ==
The Jena Band of Choctaw Reservation (31°26′16″N 92°29′56″W) is located in two separate parts in Grant Parish, in and near the village of Creola. The larger section is located northwest of the village, while the smaller section is located within the village.

== Culture ==
Choctaw culture has greatly evolved over the centuries, absorbing mostly European-American influences. It was also shaped by and contributed to Spanish, French, and English colonial cultures. The Choctaw were known for rapidly incorporating modernity, developing a written language, transitioning to yeoman farming methods, and accepting European Americans and African Americans into their society by birth, adoption, or marriage. 64 Parishes wrote an article on their culture in 2015.
