= Mississippi Band of Choctaw Indians =

Federally recognized tribe of Choctaw Indians in the state of Mississippi

- Government Organization
- Interactive map of Mississippi Band of Choctaw Indians
- Established: April 20, 1945 (Indian Reorganization Act)
- Tribal Headquarters: Choctaw, Neshoba County, Mississippi
- Communities: List: Bogue Chitto, Mississippi; Bogue Homa, Mississippi; Conehatta, Mississippi; Henning, Tennessee; Pearl River, Mississippi; Redwater, Mississippi; Standing Pine, Mississippi; Tucker, Mississippi

Government
  - Tribal Chief: Cyrus Ben

Population (2021)
  - Total: 11,100
- Religions: Roman Catholicism, Baptism (denomination), Methodism, Traditional beliefs
- Website: www.choctaw.org

The Mississippi Band of Choctaw Indians (Choctaw: Mississippi Chahta) is one of three federally recognized tribes of Choctaw, an Indigenous Indian people, and the only one in the state of Mississippi. On April 20, 1945, this tribe was organized under the Indian Reorganization Act of 1934. Their reservation included lands in Neshoba, Leake, Newton, Scott, Jones, Attala, Kemper, and Winston counties. The Mississippi Choctaw regained stewardship of their mother mound, Nanih Waiya mounds and cave in 2008. The Mississippi Band of Choctaw have declared August 18 as a tribal holiday to celebrate their regaining control of the sacred site. The other two Choctaw groups are the Choctaw Nation of Oklahoma, the third largest tribe in the United States, and the Jena Band of Choctaw Indians, located in Louisiana.

== History ==
=== 19th century ===
==== Indian Removal ====
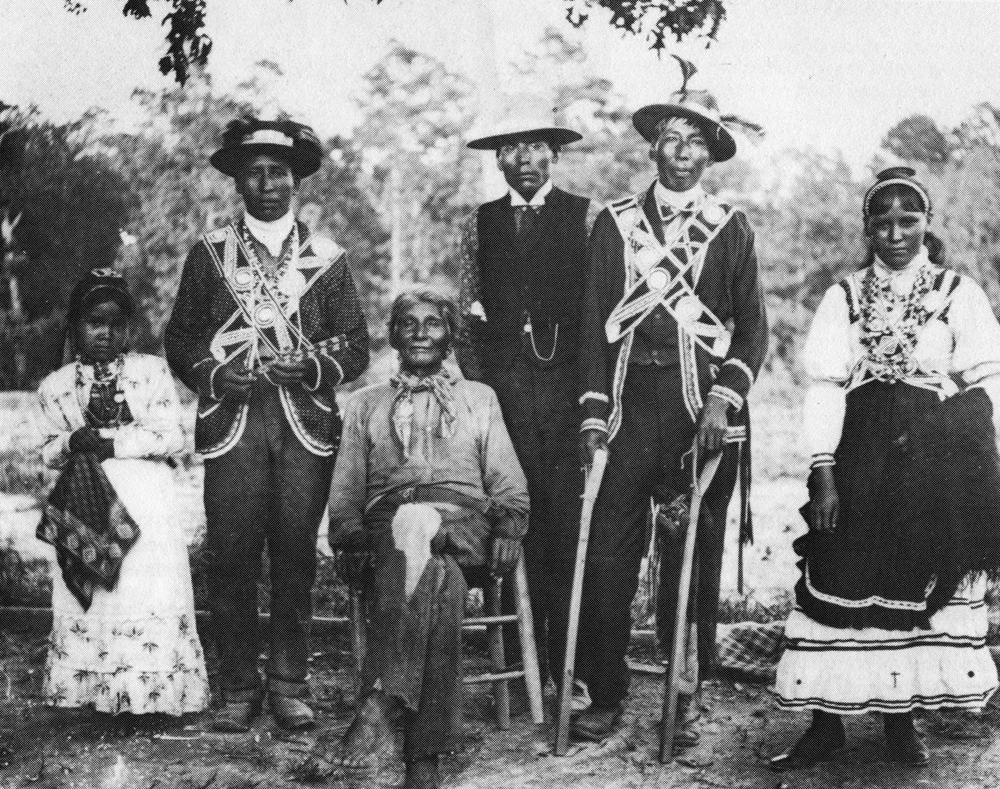
A Choctaw family in traditional clothing in 1908

The historic Choctaw had emerged as a tribe and occupied substantial territory in what is now the State of Mississippi. In the early 19th century, they faced increasing pressure from European Americans who sought to acquire their land for agricultural development. President Andrew Jackson gained congressional passage of the Indian Removal Act in 1830 to achieve this goal and eliminate Native American land claims in the Southeast.

The chiefs signed the Treaty of Dancing Rabbit Creek with the United States, which the U.S. Senate ratified on February 25, 1831. President Jackson was determined to use the Choctaw removal as a model for removing other tribes from the Southeast to territory far west of the Mississippi River. After ceding close to 11 million acres (45,000 km^{2}), the Choctaw were to emigrate in three stages: the first in the fall of 1831, the second in 1832, and the last in 1833. Although the removals continued into the early 20th century, some Choctaw remained in Mississippi and continued to live in their ancient homeland. According to the terms of removal, the nearly 5000 Choctaw who remained in Mississippi became citizens of both the state and the United States.

For the next ten years, they were subject to increasing legal conflict, harassment, and intimidation by white settlers. Racism against them was rampant. A Choctaw described their situation in 1849 as follows: "We have had our habitations torn down and burned, our fences destroyed, cattle turned into our fields and we ourselves have been scourged, manacled, fettered and otherwise personally abused, until by such treatment some of our best men have died."

==== American Civil War and Reconstruction ====
The Mississippi Choctaw participated in the American Civil War. The First Battalion of Choctaw Indians was formed by the Confederate army in 1862. while the battalion was training in Tangipahoa, Louisiana, Union forces captured it's soldiers. Some escaped and returned to Newton County, Mississippi, while the fate of the others remained unknown. Following this, Mississippi Choctaws joined the Battalion of Mounted Scouts, led by Major S.G. Spann.

Choctaw soldiers were praised for their participation in the Battle of Vicksburg. During the battle, heavy rains caused a train carrying Confederate soldiers to be swept into the water. Choctaw soldiers led by Jack Amos and Elder Williams conducted a rescue operation, saving 22 men and burying the bodies of 96 who had died.

Conditions declined for the Choctaw after the Civil War and during Reconstruction. As conservative white Democrats worked to restore white supremacy and eliminate Black suffrage, they passed a new constitution in 1890 that effectively disenfranchised Black people by creating barriers to voter registration. In addition, under racial segregation and Jim Crow laws, the whites included all people of color in the category of "other" or Negro (Black), and required them to use segregated facilities.

==== Late 19th century ====
Prior to the civil war, white and African American residents of Mississippi worshipped in the same churches, which were segregated by race, with African Americans required to sit in the back row. Choctaws refused to attend these churches because they would have been expected to sit with African Americans. With the establishment of Jim Crow, separate church services were introduced for Choctaws. These services were generally conducted in Choctaw, with Christian hymns and Choctaw songs about daily life being sung.

Because Mississippi Choctaws were barred from white schools and refused to send their children to schools for African Americans, the state established schools for the tribe in 1882. Eight schools were opened for Choctaw communities across the state, but attendance was sporadic as children were often required to work or lacked adequate clothing for school. Adults also attended the schools, which served as community centers. The community of Conehatta also formed a debating society alongside its school. The exception was the village of Bogue Chitto, where a school had existed before the Trail of Tears. As a result, elders refused to accept a new school, fearing that doing so would lead to a second removal of the tribe.

=== 20th century ===
==== Delegation to Washington, D.C. ====
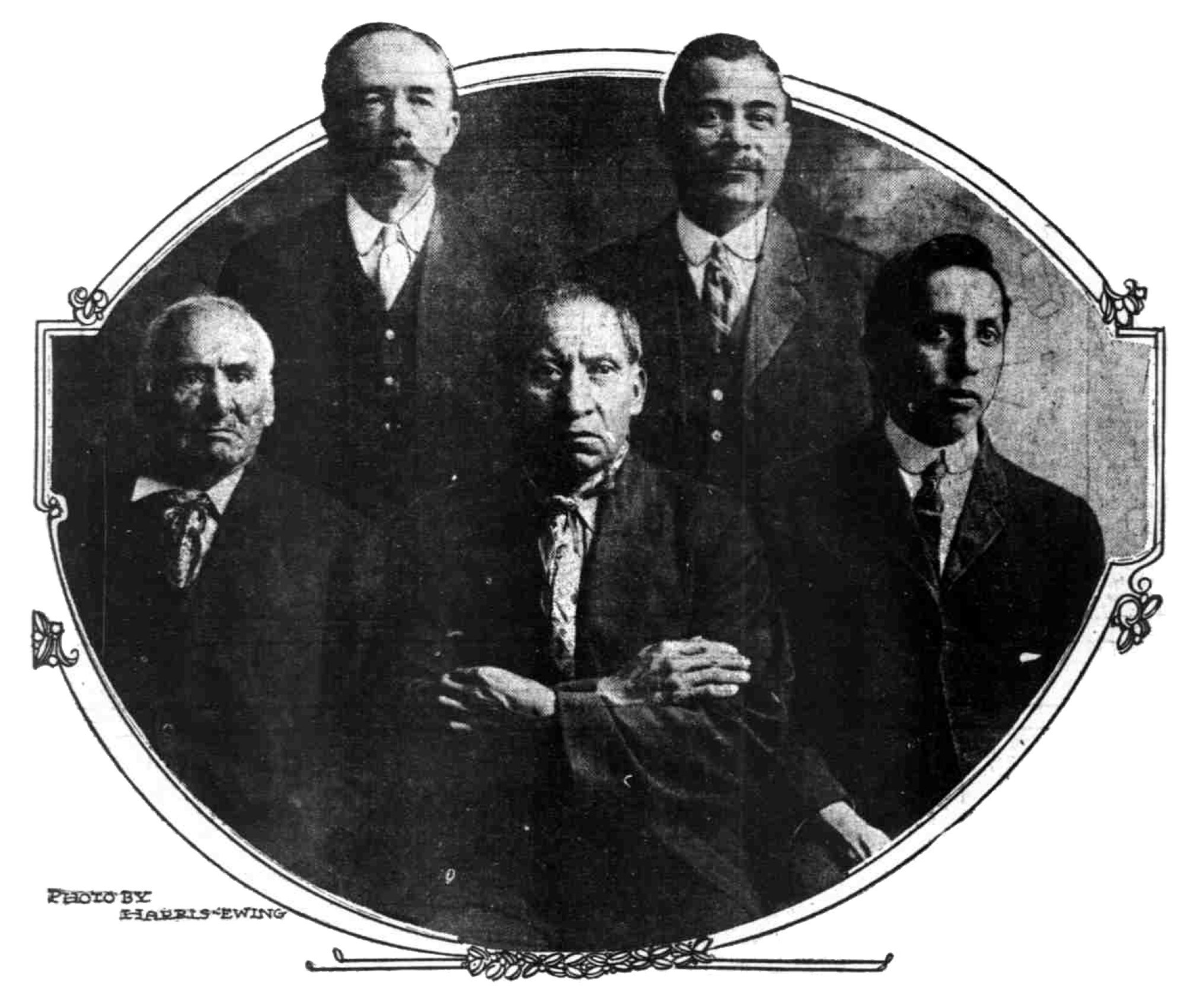
From left to right, Chief Wesley Johnson, Thomas B. Sullivan, Culberson Davis, James E. Arnold, and Emil John.

By 1907, the Mississippi Choctaw were in decline. The Dawes Commission had sent a large number of the Mississippi Choctaws to Indian Territory, and only 1,253 members remained. Meetings were held in 1913 to try to find a solution. Wesley Johnson was elected chief of the newly formed Mississippi, Alabama, and Louisiana Choctaw Council at a 1913 meeting. After deliberation, the council selected delegates to send to Washington, D.C., to bring attention to the Choctaw's plight. Historian Robert Bruce Ferguson wrote in his 2015 article that:

In late January 1914, Chief Wesley Johnson and his delegates (Culbertson Davis and Emil John) traveled to Washington, D.C. ... While they were in Washington, Johnson, Davis, and John met with numerous senators & representatives and persuaded the federals to bring the Choctaw case before Congress. On February 5th, their mission culminated with the meeting of President Woodrow Wilson. Culbertson Davis presented a beaded Choctaw belt as a token of goodwill to the President.

Nearly two years after the trip to Washington, the Indian Appropriations Act of 1916 was passed. A stipulation allocated $1,000 to investigate the Mississippi Choctaws' condition. John R.T. Reeves was tasked with investigating the condition of Indians living in Mississippi and reporting his findings to Congress. Reeves submitted his report on November 6, 1916.

==== Hearing at Union, Mississippi ====
In March 1917, federal representatives held hearings attended by approximately 100 Choctaws to examine the needs of the Mississippi Choctaw. Some congressmen who presided over the hearings were Charles D. Carter of Oklahoma, William W. Hastings of Oklahoma, Carl T. Hayden of Arizona, John N. Tillman of Arkansas, and William W. Venable of Mississippi. These hearings resulted in improved access to health care, housing, and schools.

At the onset of World War I, military conscription was a contested issue among the Choctaw. Some opposed conscription, with the primary concern among Mississippi Choctaws being their lack of US citizenship. Members of the tribe appealed to Monsignor Ketcham, director of the Bureau of Indian Catholic Missions, and A.J Ahern, a priest at the Tucker Indian Mission, explaining their concerns. Ketcham and Ahern attempted to obtain exemptions for Mississippi Choctaw men, arguing that state citizenship was not equivalent to US citizenship, but their efforts were unsuccessful. One complaint was put to the War Cabinet for draft evasion, but no prosecution followed. In total, 59 Mississippi Choctaws served in World War I.

The Spanish Influenza also struck the community during the war, killing up to 25% of Mississippi Choctaws.

==== 1920s and land disputes ====
In 1922, The Office of Indian Affairs (OIA) sent an inspector to assess the Choctaw schools. The inspector was appalled by the poor conditions and teaching standards at the schools and recommended that the OIA cease all involvement with them. As a result, between 1921 and 1930, the OIA established seven government-funded day schools for Mississippi Choctaws. The schools were intended to suppress Indigenous identity, they instead strengthened Choctaw identity by separating Choctaw children from African American schools. Adults also attended evening classes, while the schools served as community spaces where women held sewing circles and cooking clubs and discussed community matters.

School attendance was often low because white landlords required Choctaw children to work. As Mississippi Choctaws largely lived on land owned by white men and were state citizens, they were subject to state laws governing sharecropping. Many landlords opposed educating Choctaws because they feared that education would make them less vulnerable to being deceived into accepting lower wages than promised. Following World War I, an agricultural depression caused the cotton market to collapse. Landlords seized corn that Choctaws had saved for food, leaving Choctaws at risk of starvation.

Following failed attempts by Choctaw agents to combat the landlords, federal officials concluded the only way to end peonage among Mississippi Choctaws was to help them acquire their own farms. The agency had a fund for reimbursable loans for this purpose, but obtaining deeds and land titles became a major obstacle, with transactions taking years to complete. Agent Robert J. Enochs and Choctaw Agency clerk Harry M. Carter discovered unissued Choctaw land patents covering a total of 23,000–25,000 acres. During a Senate subcommittee hearing in Philadelphia, Enochs and Carter stated they had located the heirs to these patents and asked them to claim the land. They noted, however, that those attempting to redeem the patents would likely be shot. The subcommittee also agreed that displacing white farmers from the lands would be a disaster.

Eleven Choctaws testified before the Subcommittee, with the primary issue being the unredeemed land patents. When asked whether they would be content with other lands, the witness, Pat Chitto stated they would be more satisfied if they could obtain their ancestors’ allotments. The Indian Service continued purchasing farms for the tribe, and the proportion of Mississippi Choctaws working as sharecroppers fell from 90% to 75% by 1927 and 50% by 1950. However, the agency's purchases fell short of the government’s aspirations. To prevent the collapse of Choctaw communities through the foreclosure of farms belonging to families that had defaulted on their loans, the federal government decided in 1939 to take the lands into trust. By 1946, 80% of farm loans had been defaulted and the associated lands taken into trust.

During the 1920s, Mississippi Choctaw largely avoided targeting by the Ku Klux Klan by accommodating themselves to segregation and emphasizing their “full-blood” identity. This meant the Klan did not classify the tribe as “colored,” but Mississippi Choctaws were nevertheless excluded from facilities reserved for whites. For example, when Choctaws travelled to the Choctaw Agency for business, white hotels refused them accommodation. They also refused to stay in housing designated for African Americans and instead slept outdoors. As a result, Choctaws sometimes stayed in stables, the agent eventually rented a building for them, although it was described as being “hardly more than a shed.”

==== 1930s and reorganization ====
During the Great Depression and the Roosevelt administration, officials implemented numerous initiatives to alleviate some of the social and economic conditions in the South. The 1933 Special Narrative Report described the dismal welfare conditions of the Mississippi Choctaw, whose population had declined to 1,665 people by 1930.

In 1934, the implementation of the Indian Reorganization Act (IRA) led to a dispute between Mississippi Choctaw leaders and federal officials over the creation of a tribal government. The two principal officials involved were Commissioner of Indian Affairs John Collier and Choctaw superintendent Archie Hector. As a result of the dispute, Hector created the Tribal Business Committee (TBC), consisting of 17 delegates, to allow the tribe to consider adopting the IRA. The delegates could only convene when Hector permitted them to and could be replaced at his discretion. The TBC agreed to the IRA in principle, but expressed concerns about poverty and the lack of education within the communities.

The following month, Joe Chitto, a TBC delegate, wrote to Collier about the formation of a tribal government. Collier encouraged Chitto to organize a council and adopt a constitution in anticipation of the IRA’s passage. Representatives from the seven Choctaw communities in the state subsequently assembled and, citing their approval of the IRA, created the Mississippi Choctaw Indian Federation (MCIF). They approved a constitution drafted by state senator Earl Richardson, who simultaneously founded the Mississippi Choctaw Welfare Association (MCWA). Richardson had founded the MCWA to assist with the Implementation of the IRA.

Hector considered the existence of these organizations to be insubordination. He opposed their existence and believed that all tribal actions should be conducted through him. A petition calling for his removal was subsequently created and signed by more than 250 Choctaws. The petition was endorsed by TBC delegates, women's sewing circles, and community farm chapters. In response, Collier wrote to Chitto, accepting full blame for allowing two organizations to form. However, he regarded the MCIF and MCWA as primarily anthropological organizations, and encouraged them to conduct historical research and preserve Choctaw traditions. He concluded that the TBC would remain the only organization officially representing the tribe.

Chitto responded that the MCIF had not been formed to oppose the TBC, but that it would boycott the committee’s next meeting, because the majority of Choctaws supported the MCIF. He criticized the IRA and TBC as undemocratic, and objected to Collier’s characterization of the MCIF as a faction, arguing that it engaged in grassroots politics and that those who signed the petition had done so as individuals rather than as members of the MCIF. He also argued that, despite the TBC’s claim that all Choctaws would have a voice in the committee, Choctaws living outside the seven settlements had no representation. In contrast, the MCIF allowed membership to any Choctaw over 21 who was the head of a household and had more than one-half Choctaw ancestry.

E.T. Winston, a newspaper editor and member of the MCWA, also attempted to lobby Collier in support of recognition for the MCIF. Collier responded that he appreciated the interest of Mississippi citizens in the Choctaws but reiterated that the TBC was the only legitimate council. Further disputes between the MCIF and Hector led to boycotts and strikes against the TBC. In 1935, the Mississippi Choctaw communities voted on whether to adopt the IRA. Bogue Homa, Tucker, Conehatta, Pearl River, and Red Water voted in favour of the act, while Bogue Chitto cast only 3 votes in total. Standing Pine was the only community to vote against the act.

In 1934, President Franklin Roosevelt signed into law the Indian Reorganization Act. As a result, the Mississippi Choctaw reorganized as the Choctaw Business Committee in that year. A rival organization, the Mississippi Choctaw Indian Federation, formed to oppose the Choctaw Business Committee, due to concerns that the Committee was dominated by the Bureau of Indian Affairs (BIA). The Federation disbanded in 1935, some "trouble makers" were moved to another jurisdiction.

==== World War II and 1940s ====
The 18,000 acres (73 km^{2}) of land that had been taken into trust following defaults on loans were designated as reservation land by the Secretary of the Interior in 1944.

Following the disbanding of the second TBC council, the communities elected representatives to form a temporary tribal council. The council’s purpose was to draft a constitution under the IRA. At a subsequent meeting the council and proposed constitution were approved by a vote of 346 to 71. the Mississippi Choctaw reorganized on April 20, 1945, as the Mississippi Band of Choctaw Indians when the U.S. government federally recognized the tribe and ratified its constitution. This gave them sovereignty and independence from the state government. Mississippi continued to be dominated by conservative whites of the Democratic Party, who maintained legal racial segregation and disenfranchisement well into the late 20th century.

==== Post-Reorganization, Korean War, and 1950s ====
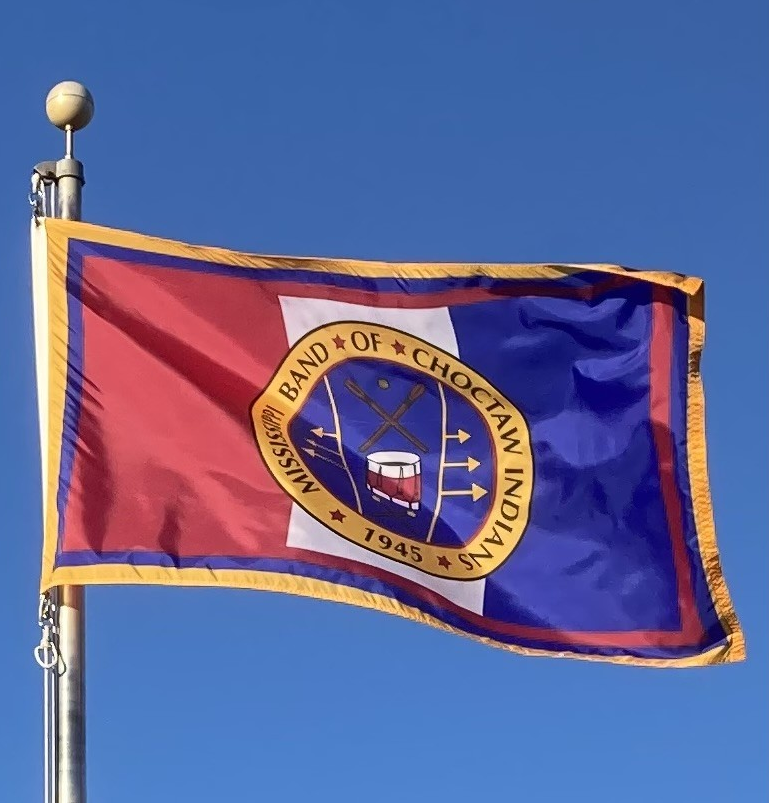
Flag of the Mississippi Band of Choctaw Indians

In the 1950s, successive Republican administrations, supported by conservative Democrats in the South (a one-party region), became impatient with the gradual assimilation of Native Americans. Republicans proposed to terminate the special status of those tribes that they thought were more fully assimilated. In 1959, the Choctaw Termination Act was passed. Congress settled on a policy to terminate tribes as quickly as possible, believing that was a route of assimilation. During the same period, the federal government, concerned about the isolation of many Native Americans living on reservations in rural areas with scarce job opportunities, created relocation programs to cities. They aimed to increase job and cultural opportunities for American Indians. Indian policy experts hoped to expedite the assimilation of Native Americans into the larger American society, which was becoming increasingly urbanized.

The Choctaw people continued to struggle economically due to bigotry, cultural isolation, and lack of jobs in their rural area. However, with the reorganization and establishment of a tribal government over the next decades, they took control of their "schools, health care facilities, legal and judicial systems, and social service programs."

==== Civil Rights Movement, Vietnam War, and 1960s ====
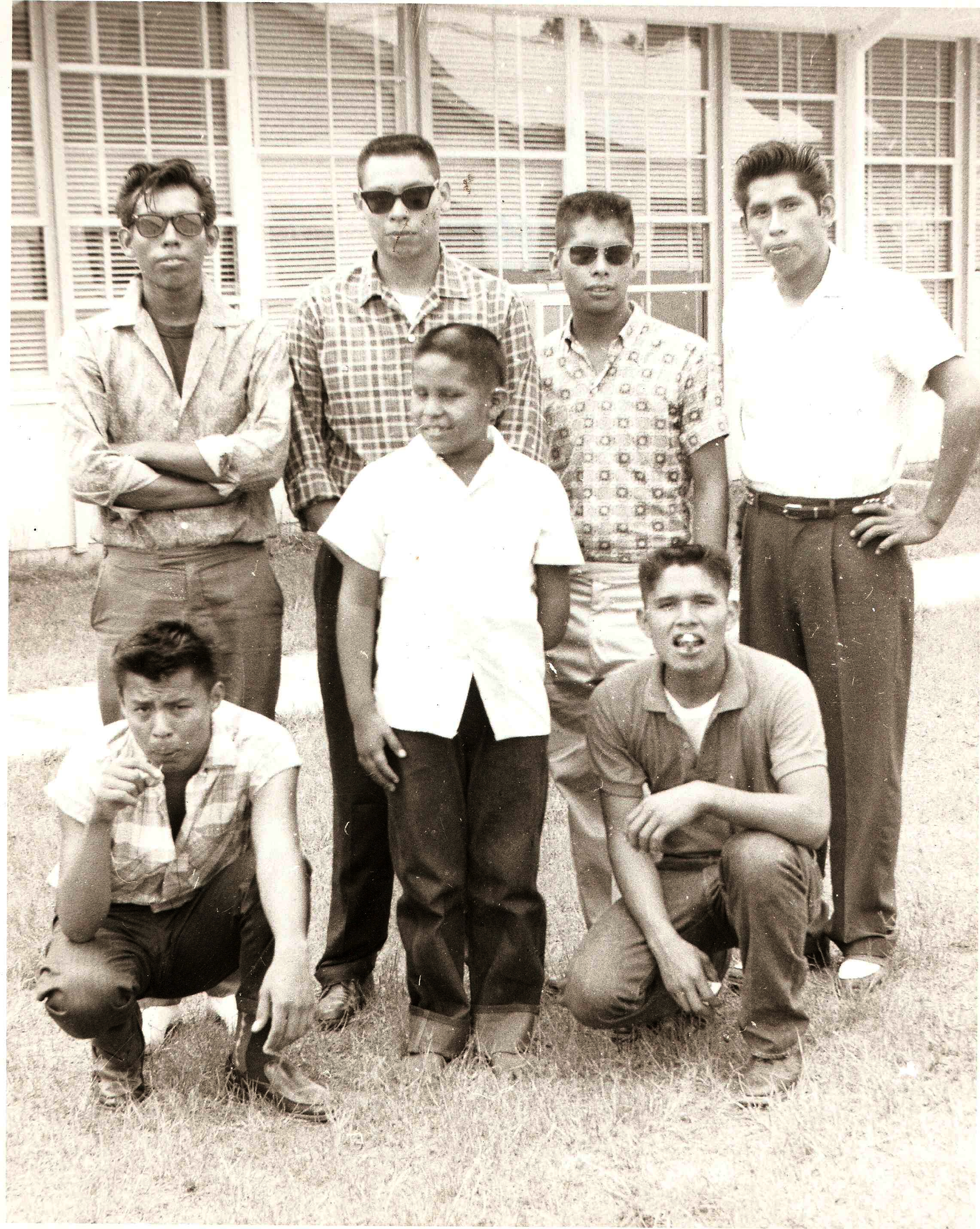
Group of Mississippi Choctaw males in the late 50s or early 60s. Photograph by Bob Ferguson.

In the Civil Rights era, roughly between 1965 and 1982, Native Americans renewed their commitments to the value of their ancient heritage. They worked to celebrate their strengths and to exercise appropriate rights, dramatically reversing the trend of abandoning Indian culture and tradition. During the 1960s, Community Action programs connected with Native Americans were based on citizen participation. Democratic President John F. Kennedy decided against implementing additional termination of tribal status. He did enact some of the last terminations in process, such as that of the Ponca. Both presidents Lyndon Johnson and Republican Richard Nixon repudiated the termination of the federal government's special relationships with Native American tribes. In March 1968, President Johnson delivered a special message to Congress on the problems of the American Indian, titled "The Forgotten American," where he stated:

We must affirm the right of the first Americans to remain Indians while exercising their rights as Americans. We must affirm their rights to freedom of choice and self-determination.

The Choctaw witnessed the social forces that brought Freedom Summer to their ancient homeland. The Civil Rights Era produced significant social change for the Choctaw in Mississippi, as their civil rights improved alongside the changing conditions for African Americans. Before the Civil Rights Act of 1964, most jobs were given to whites, with blacks being considered second in line.

The Choctaw, who for 150 years had identified neither as white nor black, but were discriminated against as people of color, were "left where they had always been"—in poverty. Donna Ladd wrote that a Choctaw, now in her 40s, remembers "as a little girl, she thought that a 'white only' sign in a local store meant she could only order white, or vanilla, ice cream. It was a small story, but one that shows how a third race can easily get left out of the attempts for understanding." The end of legalized racial segregation permitted the Choctaw to participate in public institutions and facilities that had been reserved exclusively for white patrons.

In another major change for state governments and the federal government, politicians began to support institutionalized gambling to support state programs. Starting with New Hampshire in 1963, numerous state legislatures passed new laws to establish state-run lotteries and other gambling enterprises to raise money for government services. Native American tribes began to study gambling enterprises as a means to increase revenues on their reservations to support the economic welfare of their tribes.

==== 1970s and economic development ====
In the 1970s, the Choctaw repudiated the extremes of Indian activism. Shortly after, Congress passed the landmark Indian Self-Determination and Education Assistance Act of 1975, marking the end of 15 years of federal policy reform for American Indian tribes. The legislation authorized tribes to negotiate contracts with the BIA to manage more of their own educational and social service programs, provided direct grants to help tribes develop plans for assuming responsibility, and provided for Indian parents' involvement on school boards.

==== Leadership ====
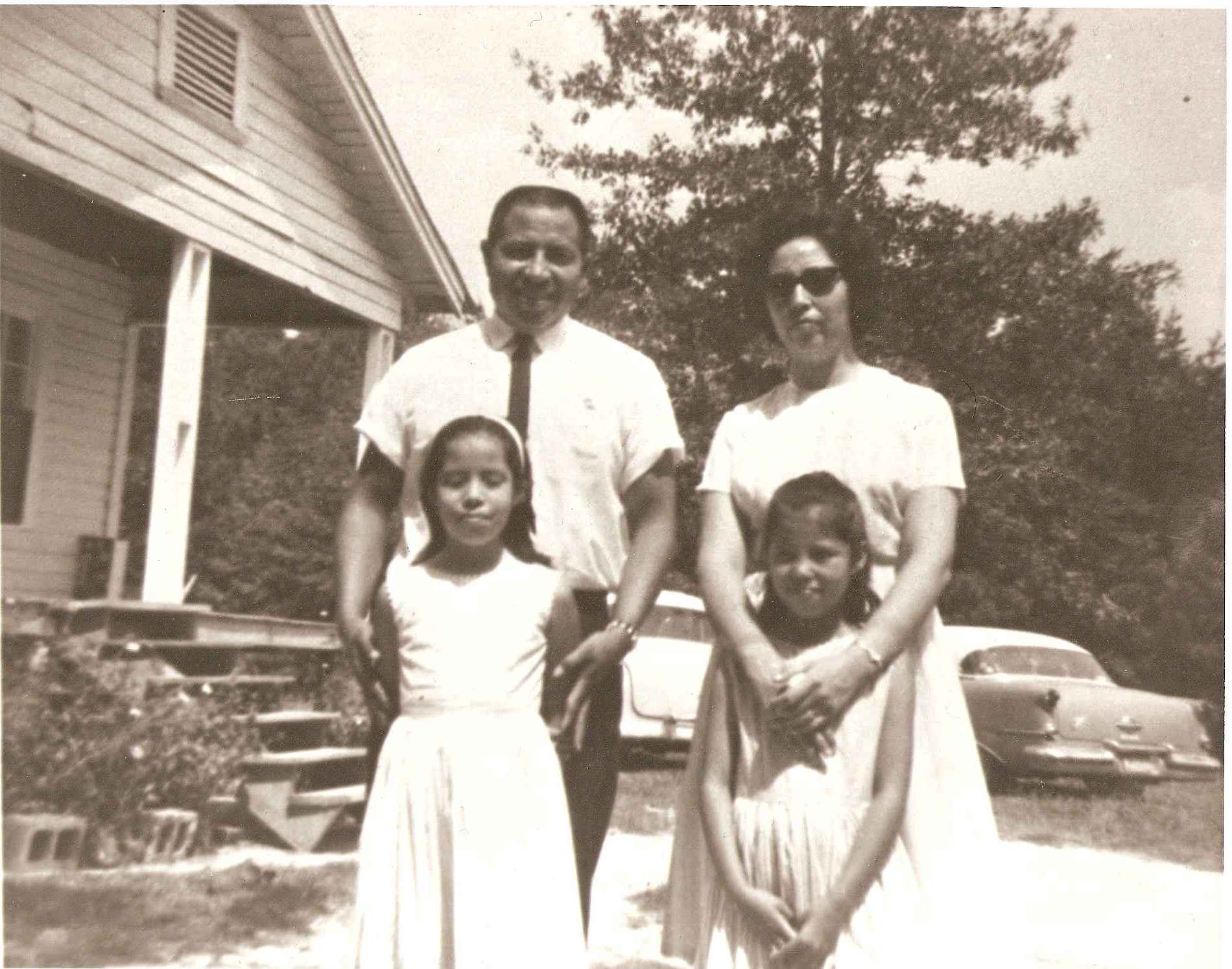
Phillip Martin and family in the late 1950s or early 1960s

Phillip Martin, who had served in the U.S. Army in Europe during World War II, returned to Neshoba County, Mississippi, to visit his former home. After seeing the poverty of his people, he decided to stay to help. Will D. Campbell, a Baptist minister and civil rights activist, also witnessed the destitution of the Choctaw in the postwar years. He would later write,

the thing I remember the most ... was the depressing sight of the Choctaws, their shanties along the country roads, grown men lounging on the dirt streets of their villages in demeaning idleness, sometimes drinking from a common bottle, sharing a roll-your-own cigarette, their half-clad children a picture of hurting that would never end.

Martin served as chairperson in various Choctaw committees up until 1977. In 1979 he was elected as Chief, or Miko, of the Mississippi Band of Choctaw Indians. He served for 32 years, being re-elected until 2007.

Beginning in 1979, the tribal council worked on a variety of economic development initiatives, first geared toward attracting industry to the reservation. They had people available to work, natural resources, and no taxes. The kind of industries included automotive parts, greeting cards, direct mail and printing, and plastic molding.

==== 1980s–1990s ====
In 1987, the Supreme Court of the United States ruled that federally recognized tribes could operate gaming facilities on their sovereign reservation land free from state regulation. In 1988, the U.S. Congress enacted the Indian Gaming Regulatory Act (IGRA). IGRA set the terms for Native American tribes to operate casinos and negotiate terms with states, such as paying a portion of revenues instead of taxes.

The administration of Governor Ray Mabus delayed action on Indian gaming in Mississippi. However, in 1992, Governor Kirk Fordice gave permission for the Mississippi Band of Choctaw Indians to develop Class III gaming. As a result, MBCI now runs a substantial gaming enterprise through its Pearl River Resort properties and Choctaw Resort Development Enterprise, Inc. The MBCI gaming properties include the Silver Star Casino, which opened in 1994 in Philadelphia, MS; the Golden Moon Casino, which opened in 2002 in Choctaw, MS; the Bok Homa Casino, which opened in 2010 in Heidelberg, MS; and the Crystal Sky Casino, which opened in 2024 in Louisville, MS. The Silver Star and Golden Moon Casinos are both located on MBCI's Pearl River Reservation in Neshoba County, MS.

=== 21st century ===
The Mississippi Band of Choctaw Indians has become one of the state's largest employers. During the early 21st century, they ran 19 businesses and employed 7,800 people.

Purporting to represent Native Americans before Congress and state governments to aid them in setting up gaming on their reservation, lobbyists Jack Abramoff and Michael Scanlon used fraudulent means to gain profits of $15 million in payment from MBCI. Abramoff expressed contempt for many of his clients. In an E-mail sent January 29, 2002, Abramoff told Scanlon, "I have to meet with the monkeys from the Choctaw tribal council."

Congressional hearings on the Abramoff scandal were held by the Senate Committee on Indian Affairs in 2006. Federal charges were brought against Abramoff and Scanlon.

== Return of Nanih Waiya ==
After nearly two hundred years, the Mississippi Band of Choctaw regained stewardship of Nanih Waiya from the state of Mississippi. Nanih Waiya is a platform mound with an adjacent conical mound and remnants of an earthwork embankment. The earliest dates for construction of the earthworks are from 100 to 400 CE. Choctaw people venerated this site and nearby Nanih Waiya Cave as their place of origin and the home of their ancestors. For years, the state protected the site as a Mississippi state park. It returned Nanih Waiya to the Choctaw in 2006 under Mississippi Legislature State Bill 2803.

The deed was signed on August 18, 2008. The Choctaw have celebrated the day since as a tribal holiday, and made it an occasion to tell stories of their origin and history, serve traditional foods, and conduct related dances.

== Government ==
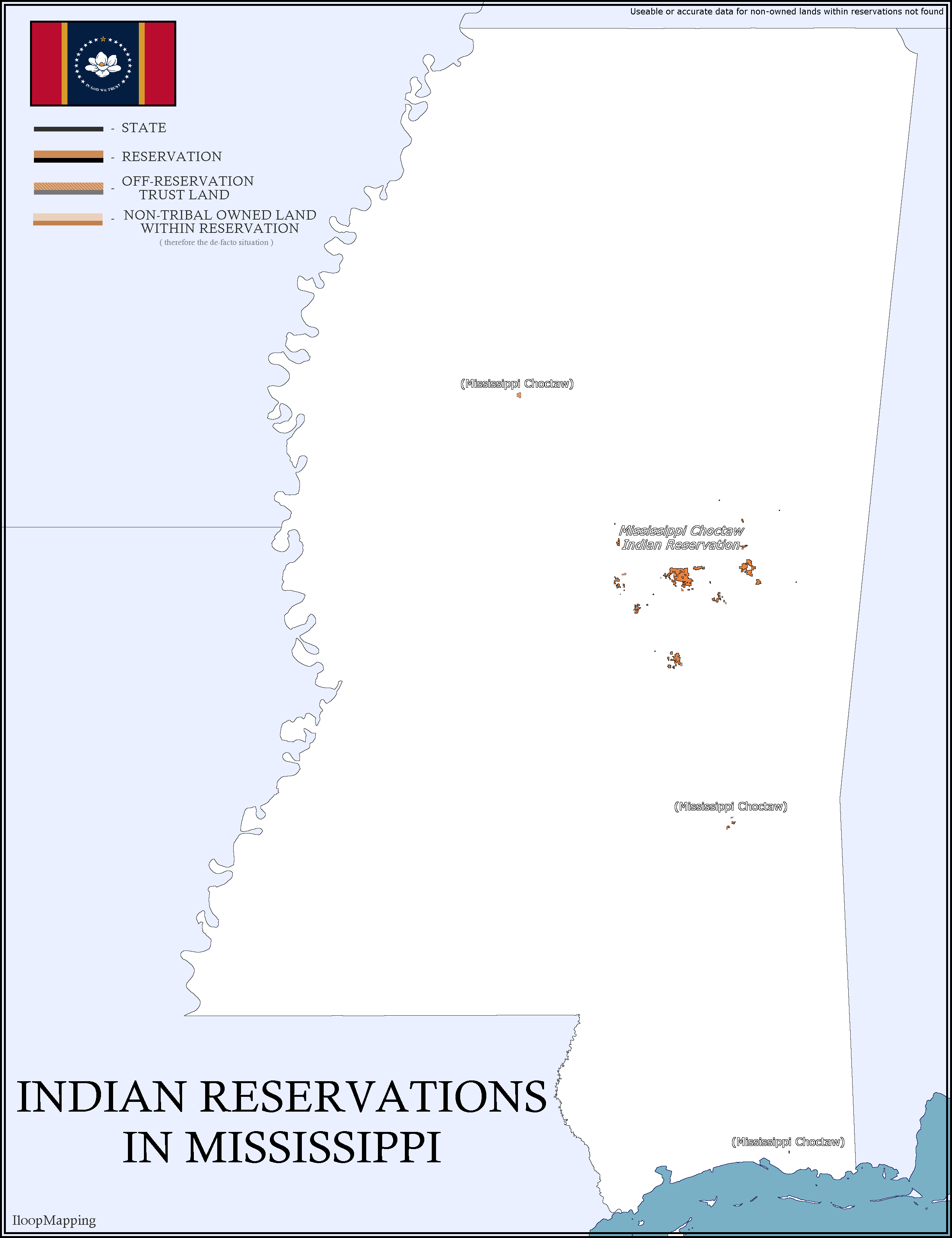
Map of the Mississippi Band of Choctaw Indians.

The current Miko or tribal chief of the Mississippi Band of Choctaw Indians is Cyrus Ben, having been re-elected to a second term in 2023. Ben was first elected in 2019, defeating incumbent tribal chief Phyliss J. Anderson. Ben is the youngest tribal chief elected.

In July 2007, Beasley Denson was elected to replace the previous Chief Philip Martin. Under Denson, the title of Chief was changed to Miko, the Choctaw name for the tribe's leader. Denson served until 2011, when Phyliss J. Anderson won the election as the Choctaw's first female chief. Anderson chose not to use Miko as a title, instead using the traditional title of Chief.

Martin had been democratically elected for seven consecutive terms. Martin had reduced the tribe's 75% unemployment rate in 1979 to 4% unemployment in 2001. During his tenure, he led the tribe to become the second-largest employer in Mississippi.

== Locations ==
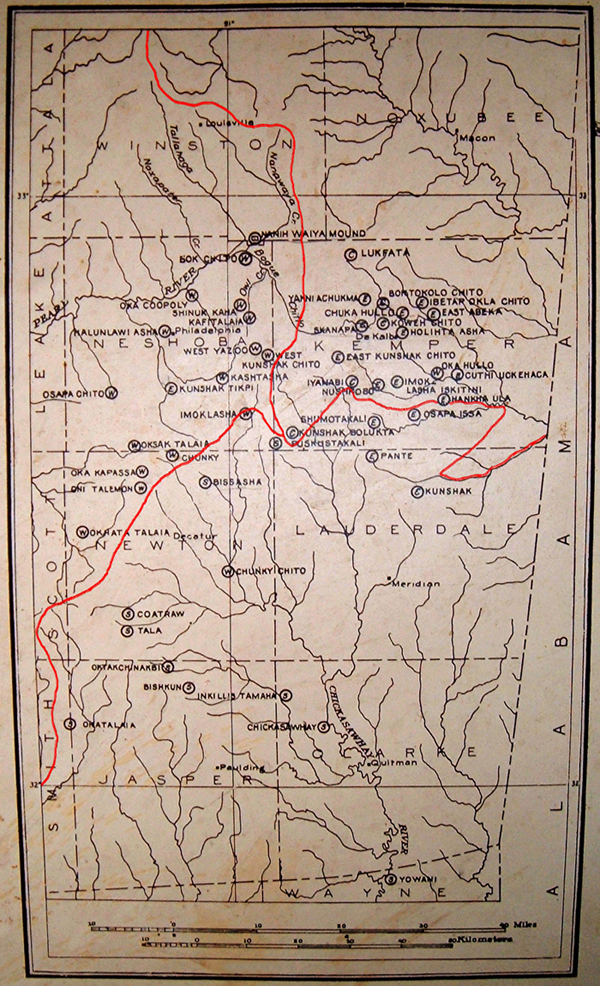
Map of Old Choctaw country in Mississippi before removal.

Location of Mississippi Choctaw Indian Reservation

Old Choctaw country included dozens of towns, such as Lukfata, Koweh Chito, Oka Hullo, Pante, Osapa Chito, Oka Cooply, and Yanni Achukma, located in and around Neshoba and Kemper counties.

The Choctaw regularly traveled hundreds of miles from their homes for long periods of time, moving to seasonal hunting grounds in the winter. They set out early in the fall and returned to their reserved lands at the opening of spring to plant their gardens. At that time they visited the Europeans at Columbus, Mississippi; Macon, Brooksville, and Crawford, and the region where Yazoo City now is located.

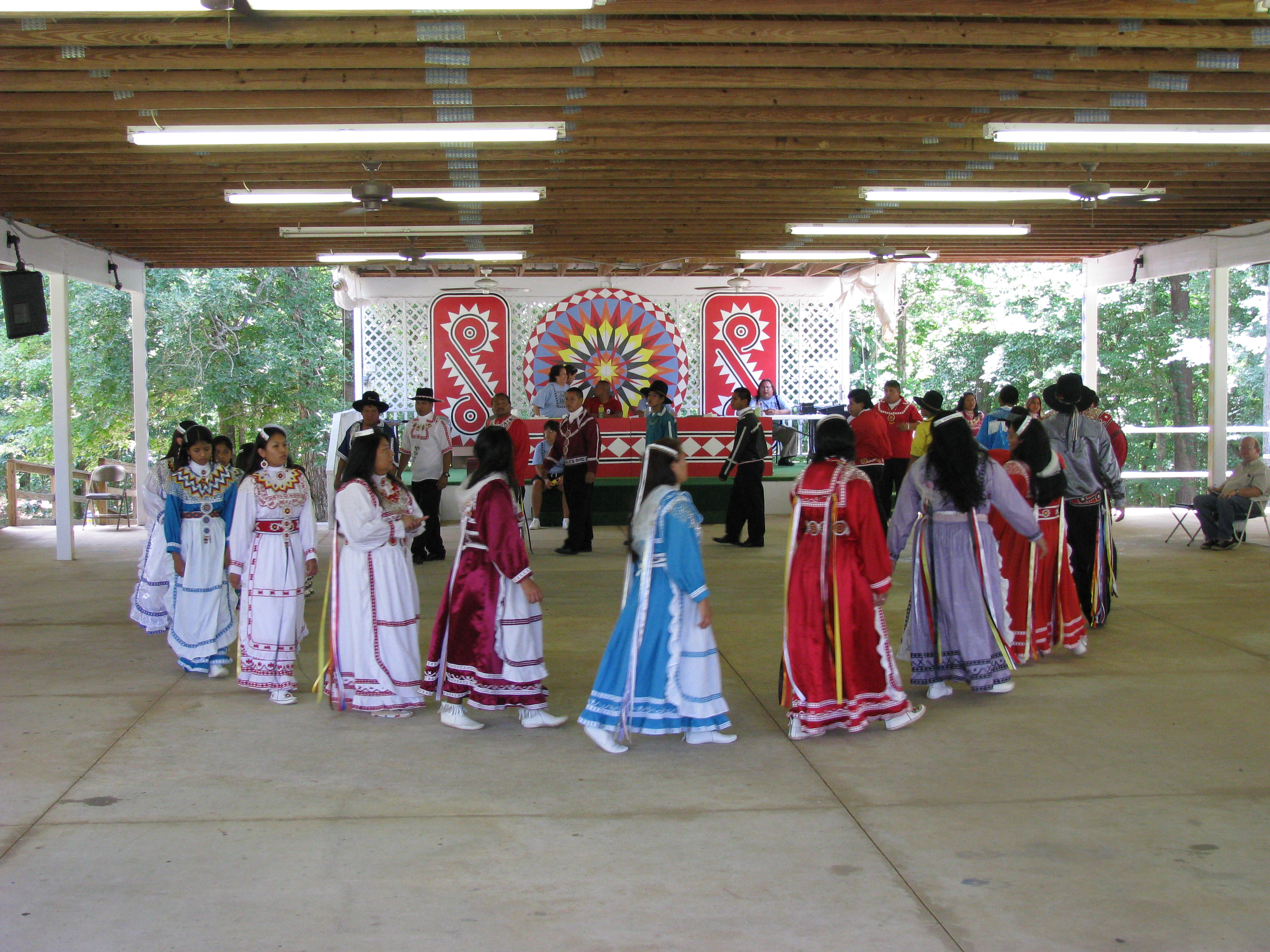
Dancers at the Choctaw Indian Fair in Neshoba County

Presently, the Mississippi Choctaw Indian Reservation has nine communities:

- Bogue Chitto or "Bok Cito", Mississippi
- Bogue Homa
- Conehatta
- Crystal Ridge
- Henning, Tennessee
- Pearl River
- Red Water
- Tucker
- Standing Pine

These communities are located in parts of ten counties in Mississippi and one in Tennessee. The largest concentration of land is in Neshoba County, at 32°48′56″N 89°14′46″W, which comprises more than two-thirds of the reservation's land area and holds more than 62 percent of its population, as of the 2000 census. The total land area is about 35,000 acres (140 km^{2}), with "approximately 11,000 Tribal members and 2,300 residential units spread across Choctaw Tribal land". The ten counties are Neshoba, Newton, Leake, Kemper, Jones, Winston, Attala, Jackson, Scott, and Carroll counties. Henning, Tennessee community is in Lauderdale County, TN.

== Notable people ==
- Beasley Denson, tribal chief, 2007—2011
- Jeffrey Gibson, artist
- Phillip Martin, tribal chief, 1978—2007
- Powtawche Valerino, engineer

== See also ==
- Choctaw
- Choctaw Nation of Oklahoma
- Jena Band of Choctaw Indians
