= Pearl River Resort =

Casino resort in Choctaw, Mississippi

Coordinates: 32.772337°N 89.206409°W

- Interactive map of Pearl River Resort
- Location: Highway 16 West Choctaw, Mississippi 39350
- No. of rooms: 1,074
- Signature attractions: Dancing Rabbit Golf Club; Geyser Falls Water Theme Park; Clearwater Key
- Casino type: Land
- Owner: Mississippi Band of Choctaw Indians

Pearl River Resort is a gaming resort located in Choctaw, Neshoba County, Mississippi. It is owned and operated by the federally recognized Mississippi Band of Choctaw Indians. The resort includes two casinos, Silver Star Hotel & Casino and Golden Moon Hotel & Casino; a Dancing Rabbit Inn near the casinos; Dancing Rabbit Golf Club, an award-winning golf course designed by Jerry Pate; Geyser Falls Water Theme Park; and a spa.

These casinos are the only Native American gaming facilities in the state of Mississippi, as the Mississippi Choctaw are the only federally recognized tribe in the state. When approved for opening in 2000, these were the only casinos in the state approved for land-based structures. At the time, by state law other gaming activity was limited to riverboats or floating structures on the rivers or Gulf Coast. In the aftermath of extensive damage to waterfront gaming on the Gulf Coast from Hurricane Katrina in 2005, the state legislature changed some of its rules related to private gaming facilities.

== History ==
The first casino, Silver Star, opened in 1994 on tribal lands near Philadelphia, Mississippi. The tribe had the Golden Moon constructed directly across the road in 2002. Golden Moon features a curving hotel structure that rises to a globe-shaped top. The Mississippi Choctaw are the only federally recognized tribe in the state and thus the only tribe authorized to operate a gaming facility on its reservation lands.

In January 2003, Hard Rock International signed a licensing agreement with Choctaw tribe, led by Chief Phillip Martin, to expand the resort. They opened Hard Rock Beach Club directly adjacent to the tribe's Geyser Falls Water Theme Park on Pushmataha Lake in June of that year, with Hard Rock owning the 9-acre (3.6 ha) private beach and the tribe retaining ownership of the property.

A 300-room Hard Rock Hotel would be Phase II of the project, aggressively scheduled to open by 2006 and would have become the third major hotel tower at the Pearl River Resort. However, the beachclub permanently closed on January 24, 2005, as it failed to property attract tourists, and the spiritual successor to this project is the Hard Rock Hotel & Casino Biloxi.

In reaction to a downturn in the economy, in January 2009 Tribal Miko Beasley Denson announced that the Golden Moon would reduce its hours, to operate on Fridays, Saturdays and Sundays only. The tribe laid off 570 workers, none of whom was a tribal member. In addition to the recession affecting its business, the facility had to compete with a new gaming facility in Alabama developed by the federally recognized Poarch Band of Creek Indians.

The Mississippi Choctaw invested some $71 million in renovations to the casino and hotel to increase its appeal. After reopening the Golden Moon in January 2015, the tribe said that it employed some 2400 to 3000 workers in total at its facilities, the majority of whom are tribal members. Their hiring increases to satisfy seasonal demand in the busy summer months. The number of visitors increases with people drawn to the resort water park and to play golf.
