= Sideloading =

Transferring files between local devices

Sideloading is the process of transferring files between two local devices, in particular between a personal computer and a mobile device such as a mobile phone, smartphone, PDA, tablet, portable media player or e-reader.

Sideloading typically refers to media file transfer to a mobile device via USB, Bluetooth, WiFi or by writing to a memory card for insertion into the mobile device, but also applies to the transfer of apps from web sources that may not be vendor-approved.

When referring to Android apps, "sideloading" typically means installing an application package in APK format onto an Android device. Such packages are usually downloaded from websites or app stores other than the official app store Google Play. For Android users sideloading of apps is only possible if the user has allowed "Install apps from unverified developers" in their settings. However, as of March 2026 Google plans to prevent side-loading apps onto certified devices from developers not approved by the company, starting in September 2026 in some countries (Brazil, Indonesia, Singapore or Thailand), and globally in 2027.

When referring to iOS apps, "sideloading" means installing an app in IPA format onto an Apple device, usually through the use of a computer program such as AltStore or Xcode. On modern versions of iOS, the sources of the apps must be trusted by both Apple and the user in "profiles and device management" in settings, except when using jailbreak methods of sideloading apps. Sideloading is only allowed by Apple for internal testing and development of apps using the official SDKs.

The use of the term "sideloading" to describe downloading and installing an app outside of sanctioned means is controversial and not universally accepted.

== Historical ==
The term "sideload" was coined in the late 1990s by online storage service i-drive as an alternative means of transferring and storing computer files virtually instead of physically. In 2000, i-drive applied for a trademark on the term. Rather than initiating a traditional file "download" from a website or FTP site to their computer, a user could perform a "sideload" and have the file transferred directly into their personal storage area on the service. Usage of this feature began to decline as newer hard drives became cheaper and the space on them grew each year into the gigabytes and the trademark application was abandoned.

The advent of portable MP3 players in the late 1990s brought sideloading to the masses, even if the term was not widely adopted. Users would download content to their PCs and sideload it to their players.

Today, sideloading is widespread and virtually every mobile device is capable of sideloading in one or more ways.

== Advantages ==
Sideloading has several advantages when compared with other ways of delivering content to mobile devices:

- There are no wireless data charges. Sideloading delivery does not involve a wireless carrier.
- Content can be optimized for each mobile device. As there are no mobile network restrictions, content can be tailored for each device. This is more important for video playback, where the lowest common denominator is often a limiting factor on wireless networks.
- There are no geographic limitations on the delivery of content for sideloading as are implicit in the limited coverage of wireless networks.
- There are no restrictions on what content can be sideloaded. Users may sideload video, e-books, or software which is restricted or banned in their country, including material expressing unpopular or illegal opinions and pornography.
- The content is not streamed, and can be permanently stored in the mobile device. It can be listened to or watched at the user’s convenience.
- Sideloading is an excellent mechanism for proximity marketing.
- Content that is removed from an online store, e.g., for belatedly discovered licensing violations, can still be loaded to a mobile device.

== Disadvantages ==
Sideloading also has disadvantages:

- Streaming media is sometimes preferred to downloading due to limited storage. Content providers limit content available to download and sideload due to their loss of control over it.
- There are huge variations in performance capability for mobile devices that can make use of sideloading, from simple mobile phones with limited video playback, to high-end portable media players. Unless the audio/video file is encoded with the target device in mind, playback may not be possible.
- Some wireless carriers (most notably Verizon Wireless) require that handset manufacturers limit the sideload capabilities of devices on their networks as a form of vendor lock-in. This usually results in the loss of USB and Bluetooth as sideload options (though memory card transfer is still available).

== Methods ==
=== USB sideloading ===
Sideloading over a USB connection was standardized by OMTP in late 2007. Until this time, mobile phone manufacturers had tended to adopt proprietary USB transfer solutions requiring the use of bundled or third party cables and software.

Unless additional software is installed on the device, the PC, or both, transfers can usually only be initiated by the PC. Once connected, the device will appear in the PC's file explorer window as either a media player or an external hard drive. Files and folders on the device may be copied to the PC, and the PC may copy files and folders to the device.

Transfer performance of USB sideloading varies greatly, depending on the USB version supported, and further still by the actual engineering implementation of the USB controller. USB is available in Low-Speed (1.2 Mbit/s, 150 KB/s), Full-Speed (12 Mbit/s, 1.5 MB/s), and Hi-Speed levels, with High-Speed USB transferring up to 480 Mbit/s (60 MB/s). However, the majority of mobile phones as of the time of writing of this article are Full-Speed USB. Of the mobile products supporting USB 2.0 Hi-Speed, the actual sideloading performance usually ranges from 1 to 5 MB/s. However, the popular BlackBerry mobile phones by RIM and the iPods by Apple distance themselves at higher performing speeds of roughly 15.7 MB/s and 9.6 MB/s, respectively.

=== Bluetooth sideloading ===
Bluetooth’s OBEX/OPP profiles allow for file transfer between a PC and a mobile device. Using this option is slightly more complicated than using a USB connection as the two devices have to be paired first. Also, unlike the familiar drag and drop that is usually available via USB, Bluetooth implementation is specific to the Bluetooth transceiver and drivers being used. Files that are sideloaded to mobile devices via Bluetooth are often received as messages, in the same way that SMS texts would be received. While these files can be saved to any storage medium, their initial location is the handset’s internal memory. As such the limitations of the internal memory have to be taken into account before beginning the sideload.

=== Memory card sideloading ===
Sideloading via a memory card or USB stick requires that the user be able to write to it. Audio and video files can be written directly to the memory card and then inserted into the mobile device. This is potentially the quickest way of sideloading several files at once, as long as the user knows where to put the media files.

=== Wi-Fi sideloading ===
Sideloading could also be achieved over Wi-Fi, as long as both the PC and the mobile device are connected to the same network. This method is used by AltStore on iOS to sideload and refresh apps. On Android, this may be done through any TCP connection using adb.

== See also ==
- Sneakernet
- Device neutrality
