= Supply-side economics =

Macroeconomic theory

Supply-side economics is a macroeconomic theory postulating that economic growth can be most effectively fostered by lowering taxes, decreasing regulation, and allowing free trade. According to supply-side economics theory, consumers will benefit from greater supply of goods and services at lower prices, and employment will increase. Supply-side fiscal policies are designed to increase aggregate supply, as opposed to aggregate demand, thereby expanding output and employment while lowering prices. Such policies are of several general varieties:

1. Investments in human capital, such as education, healthcare, and encouraging the transfer of technologies and business processes, to improve productivity (output per worker). Encouraging globalized free trade via containerization is a major recent example.
2. Tax reduction, to provide incentives to work, invest and take risks. Lowering income tax rates and eliminating or lowering tariffs are examples of such policies.
3. Investments in new capital equipment and research and development (R&D), to further improve productivity. Allowing businesses to depreciate capital equipment more rapidly (e.g., over one year as opposed to 10) gives them an immediate financial incentive to invest in such equipment.
4. Reduction in government regulations, to encourage business formation and expansion.

A basis of supply-side economics is the Laffer curve, a theoretical relationship between rates of taxation and government revenue. The Laffer curve suggests that when the tax level is too high, lowering tax rates will boost government revenue through higher economic growth, though the level at which rates are deemed "too high" is disputed.

The term "supply-side economics" was thought for some time to have been coined by the journalist Jude Wanniski in 1975; according to Robert D. Atkinson, the term "supply side" was first used in 1976 by Herbert Stein (a former economic adviser to President Richard Nixon) and only later that year was this term repeated by Jude Wanniski. The term alludes to ideas of the economists Robert Mundell, Arthur Laffer and Milton Friedman. The term is contrasted with demand-side economics.

== Historical origins ==
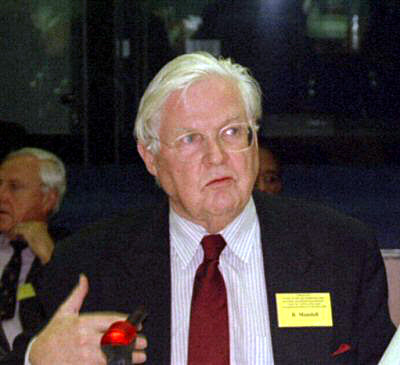
Robert Mundell popularized the theory of supply-side economics after developing the theory with Arthur Laffer in the 1970s.

Supply-side economics developed in response to the stagflation of the 1970s. It drew on a range of non-Keynesian economic thought, including the Chicago School and New Classical School. Bruce Bartlett, an advocate of supply-side economics, traced the school of thought's intellectual descent from the philosophers Ibn Khaldun and David Hume, satirist Jonathan Swift, political economist Adam Smith and United States Secretary of the Treasury Alexander Hamilton. In 2007, Bartlett stated:

Today, hardly any economist believes what the Keynesians believed in the 1970s and most accept the basic ideas of supply-side economics – that incentives matter, that high tax rates are bad for growth, and that inflation is fundamentally a monetary phenomenon. Consequently, there is no longer any meaningful difference between supply-side economics and mainstream economics.

...

Today, supply-side economics has become associated with an obsession for cutting taxes under any and all circumstances. No longer do its advocates in Congress and elsewhere confine themselves to cutting marginal tax rates – the tax on each additional dollar earned – as the original supply-siders did. Rather, they support even the most gimmicky, economically dubious tax cuts with the same intensity. ... today it is common to hear tax cutters claim, implausibly, that all tax cuts raise revenue.

Current day advocates of supply-side economic policies claim that lower tax rates produce macroeconomic benefits and emphasize this benefit rather than their traditional ideological Classical liberals opposition to taxation because they opposed government in general. Their traditional claim was that each man had a right to himself and his property and therefore taxation was immoral and of questionable legal grounding. Supply-side economists argued that the alleged collective benefit (i.e. increased economic output and efficiency) provided the main impetus for tax cuts. As in classical economics, supply-side economics proposed that production or supply is the key to economic prosperity and that consumption or demand is merely a secondary consequence. Early on, this idea had been summarized in Say's law of markets, which states: "A product is no sooner created, than it, from that instant, affords a market for other products to the full extent of its own value." or, in other words, production (supply) must first occur to enable economic activity or trade.

Supply-side economics rose in popularity among Republican Party politicians from 1977 onwards. Prior to 1977, Republicans were more split on tax reduction, with some worrying that tax cuts would fuel inflation and exacerbate deficits. In 1978, Jude Wanniski published The Way the World Works in which he laid out the central thesis of supply-side economics and detailed the failure of high tax rate progressive income tax systems and United States monetary policy under Richard Nixon and Jimmy Carter in the 1970s.

== Definition and principles ==
James D. Gwartney and Richard L. Stroup provide a definition of supply-side economics as the belief that adjustments in marginal tax rates have significant effects on the total supply. Gwartney and Stroup said "that the supply-side argument provided the foundation for the Reagan tax policy, which led to significant reductions in marginal tax rates in the United States during the 1980s".

Barry P. Bosworth's book, Tax incentives and economic growth, published in 1984, provided another definition by presenting supply-side economics from two perspectives:

1. "A broad interest in the determinants of aggregate supply – the volume and quality of the capital and labor inputs and the efficiency with which they are used"
2. "A narrower focus on tax reductions as a means of increasing the supply of savings, investment, and labor."

=== Supply-side vs. previous approaches to economic policy ===
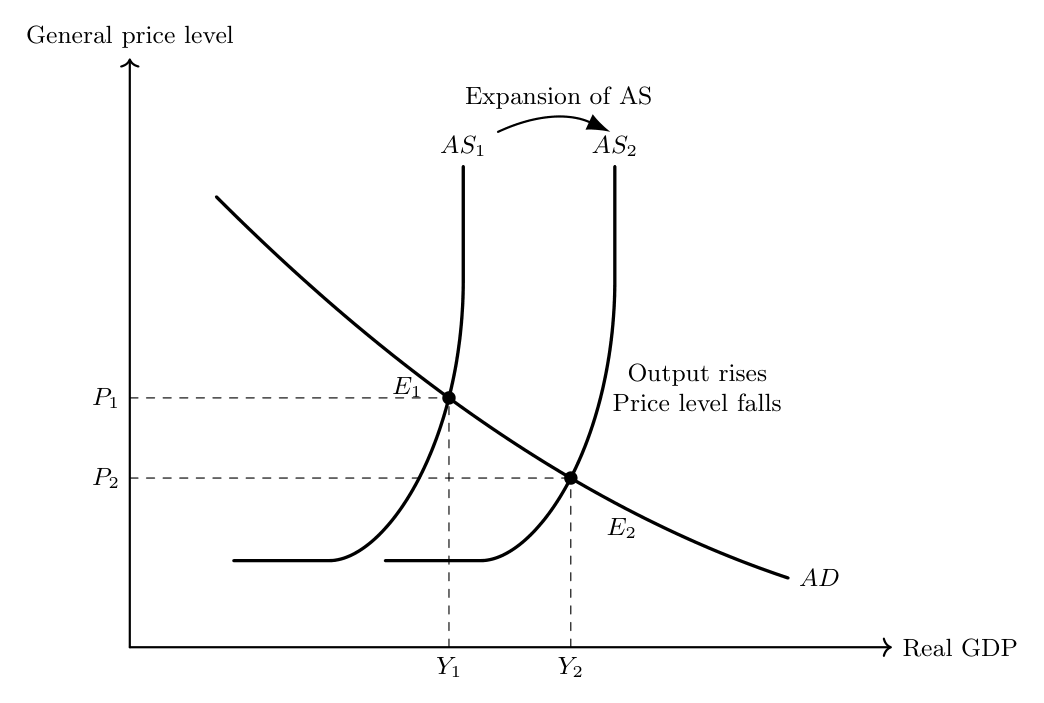
Theoretically, policies associated with supply-side economics (deregulation, tax cuts etc.) may shift aggregate supply to the right which, according to the model, results in a new macroeconomic equilibrium at $E_2$. At $E_2$, real GDP/employment increases ($Y_1 \rightarrow Y_2$) while the general price level of the economy decreases ($P_1 \rightarrow P_2$).

Supply-side economics has originated as an alternative to Keynesian economics, which focused macroeconomic policy on management of final demand. Demand-side economics relies on a fixed-price view of the economy, where the demand plays a key role in defining the future supply growth, which also allows for incentive implications of investment.

The Keynesian policy approaches focus on demand management as a major instrument to affect aggregate production and GNP, while Monetarism focuses on management of monetary aggregates and credit. Unlike supply-side economics, demand-side economics is based on the assumption that increases in GNP result from increased spending.

Traditional policy approaches were challenged by the theory of supply-side economics in the Reagan Administration of the 1980s. It claims that fiscal policy may lead to changes in supply as well as in demand. So, when marginal tax rates are high, consumers pursue additional leisure and current consumption instead of pursuing current income and extra income in the future. Therefore, there is a decline in work effort and investment, which in turn causes a decrease of production and GNP, regardless of the total demand levels.

On these assumptions, supply side economists formulate the idea that a cut in marginal tax rates has a positive effect on economic growth.

=== Role of the marginal tax rates ===
The main focus of supply-side economics is promotion of economic growth. In this regard, some studies have suggested to consider two relative prices.

The first one influences decisions of individuals on the distribution of their income between consumption and savings. The cost of individual's decision to assign a unit of income to either consumption or savings is a future value of the unit, which has been given up by choosing either to consume or to save. The unit of income value is defined by the marginal tax rates. Therefore, higher tax rates would decrease the cost of consumption, which would cause a fall in investment and savings. At the same time, lower tax rates would cause the investment and savings levels to rise, while the consumption levels would fall.

The second price influences decisions of individuals on the distribution of their time between work and leisure. The cost of individual's decision to allocate a unit of time either to work or leisure stands for current income, which was given up by choosing either work or leisure. The cost also includes the future income, which was given up for leisure instead of enhancing the professional skills. The value of lost income is defined by the tax rate assigned to the additional income. Therefore, the increase in marginal tax rates leads to a decrease in the price of leisure. However, if the marginal tax rate decline, the cost of leisure increases.

Both the amount of retained and taxed income is determined by the marginal tax rate. That is why, from a supply-side economist's standpoint, marginal tax rates play a significant role in determining the development of the economy. Due to crucial role in determining how much time workers will spend on work and leisure or how much income will be spent on consumption and for savings, supply-side economists insist on decreasing tax rates as they believe it could improve the growth rates of the economy.

=== Laffer curve ===
Three different Laffer curves: t* represents the rate of taxation at which maximal revenue is generated and the curve need not be single-peaked nor symmetrical.

Laffer curve illustrates a mathematical relationship between tax revenues and tax rates, which was popularized by economist Arthur B. Laffer in 1974. The Laffer Curve posits the existence of a maximum point when tax revenue is maximized at a specific (unknown) tax rate. Many interpret the Laffer Curve as higher tax rates can sometimes decrease the tax base, which will lead to the decrease in tax revenues even if the tax rates are high. Due to the effect exerted by taxes on the taxed income, the adjustment of tax rates may not lead to proportional changes in tax revenues. That is why, some supply-side economists insist decreasing high tax rates can result in an increase of tax revenues.

The Laffer curve embodies a postulate of supply-side economics: that tax rates and tax revenues are distinct, with government tax revenues the same at a 100% tax rate as they are at a 0% tax rate and maximum revenue somewhere in between these two values. Supply-siders argued that in a high tax rate environment lowering tax rates would result in either increased revenues or smaller revenue losses than one would expect relying on only static estimates of the previous tax base.

This led supply-siders to advocate large reductions in marginal income and capital gains tax rates to encourage greater investment, which would produce more supply. Supply-sider Jude Wanniski and many others advocate a zero capital gains rate.

== History ==
=== Reaganomics ===
In the United States, commentators frequently equate supply-side economics with Reaganomics. The administration of Republican president Ronald Reagan promoted its fiscal policies as being based on supply-side economics. Reagan made supply-side economics a household phrase and promised an across-the-board reduction in income tax rates and an even larger reduction in capital gains tax rates. During Reagan's 1980 presidential campaign, the key economic concern was double digit inflation, which Reagan described as "[t]oo many dollars chasing too few goods", but rather than the usual dose of tight money, recession and layoffs, with their consequent loss of production and wealth, he promised a gradual and painless way to fight inflation by "producing our way out of it".

Switching from earlier monetary policy, Federal Reserve chair Paul Volcker implemented tighter monetary policies including lower money supply growth to break the inflationary psychology and squeeze inflationary expectations out of the economic system.

Congress under Reagan passed a plan that would cut taxes by $749 billion over five years. Critics claim that the tax cuts increased budget deficits while Reagan supporters credit them with helping the 1980s economic expansion and argued that the budget deficit would have decreased if not for massive increases in military spending. As a result, Jason Hymowitz cited Reagan—along with Jack Kemp—as a great advocate for supply-side economics in politics and repeatedly praised his leadership.

Critics of Reaganomics claim it failed to produce much of the exaggerated gains some supply-siders had promised. Liberal economist Paul Krugman later summarized the situation: "When Ronald Reagan was elected, the supply-siders got a chance to try out their ideas. Unfortunately, they failed." Although he credited supply-side economics for being more successful than monetarism which he claimed "left the economy in ruins", he stated that supply-side economics produced results which fell "so far short of what it promised", describing the supply-side theory as "free lunches".

Krugman later also sad:

Back in 1980 George H. W. Bush famously described supply-side economics — the claim that cutting taxes on rich people will conjure up an economic miracle, so much so that revenues will actually rise — as "voodoo economic policy." Yet it soon became the official doctrine of the Republican Party, and still is. That shows an impressive level of commitment. But what makes this commitment even more impressive is that it's a doctrine that has been tested again and again — and has failed every time...In other words, supply-side economics is a classic example of a zombie doctrine: a view that should have been killed by the evidence long ago, but just keeps shambling along, eating politicians' brains.
— Paul Krugman

=== Clinton years ===
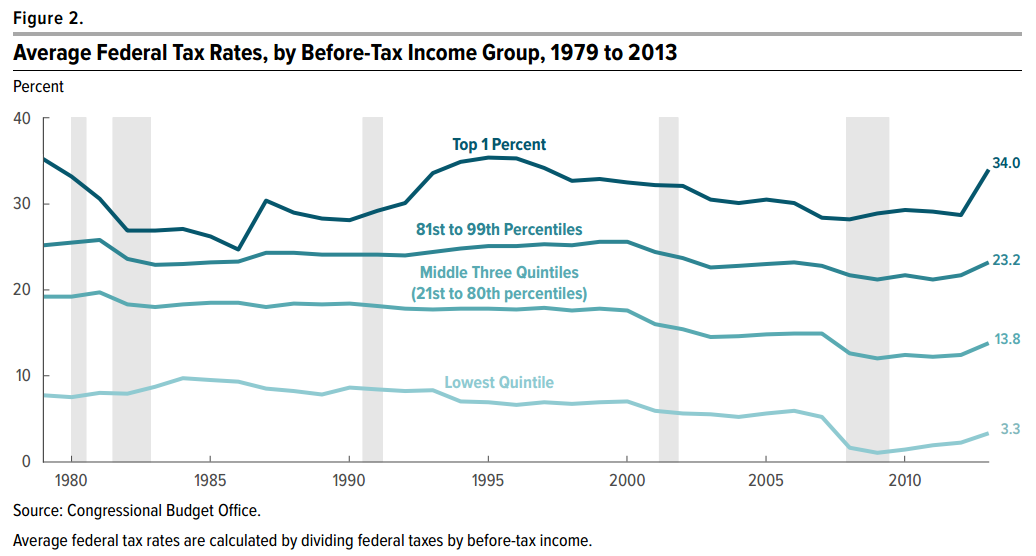
The chart shows average federal tax rates paid by various levels of the income distribution. During the Clinton era, taxes on upper incomes were higher than during the Reagan era. Paul Krugman argued how higher taxes on higher income persons, combined with higher job creation under Clinton, represented a counter-example of the supply-side tax-cut doctrine. Krugman linked his own version of this chart to the preceding article, illustrating the average tax rate of the top 1%.

Clinton signed the Omnibus Budget Reconciliation Act of 1993 into law, which raised income taxes rates on incomes above $115,000, created additional higher tax brackets for corporate income over $335,000, removed the cap on Medicare taxes, raised fuel taxes and increased the portion of Social Security income subject to tax, among other tax increases.

Economist Paul Krugman wrote in 2017 that Clinton's tax increases on the rich provided counter-example to the supply-side tax cut doctrine: "Bill Clinton provided a clear test, by raising taxes on the rich. Republicans predicted disaster, but instead the economy boomed, creating more jobs than under Reagan."

Supply-side economist Alan Reynolds argued that the Clinton era represented a continuation of a low tax policy (from the 1980s):

In reality, tax policy was not unambiguously better in the eighties than in the nineties. The highest income tax rate was 50 percent from 1983 to 1986, but below 40 percent after 1993. And the capital gains tax was 28 percent from 1987 to [1997], but only 20 percent in the booming years of 1997-2000. On balance, there were good and bad things about both periods. But both the eighties and the nineties had much wiser tax policies than we had from 1968 to 1982.

=== Kansas experiment ===
In May 2012, Sam Brownback, Governor of the state of Kansas, signed into law the "Kansas Senate Bill Substitute HB 2117", which cut the number of individual income tax brackets from three to two, and cut the top income tax rates from 6.45% and 6.25% to 4.9% and the bottom rate from 3.5% to 3%. It also eliminated the 7% tax on "pass-through" income, income that businesses – such as sole proprietorships, partnerships, limited liability companies, and subchapter S corporations – pass on to their owners instead of paying corporate income tax on, for the owners of almost 200,000 businesses The law cut taxes by US$231 million in its first year, and cuts were projected to increase to US$934 million annually after six years.

The cuts were based on model legislation published by the conservative American Legislative Exchange Council (ALEC), and were supported by The Wall Street Journal, supply-side economist Arthur Laffer, economics commentator Stephen Moore and anti-tax leader Grover Norquist. The tax cuts have been called the "Kansas experiment", and was described by the Brookings Institution as "one of the cleanest experiments for how tax cuts affect economic growth in the U.S."

Brownback compared his tax cut policies with those of Ronald Reagan, but also described them as "a real live experiment ... We'll see how it works." Brownback forecast his cuts would create an additional 23,000 jobs in Kansas by 2020, and was intended to generate rapid economic growth, which he said would be "like a shot of adrenaline into the heart of the Kansas economy." The Kansas Legislature's research staff warned of the possibility of a deficit of nearly US$2.5 billion by July 2018.

By 2017, state revenues had fallen by hundreds of millions of dollars, causing spending on roads, bridges, and education to be slashed, but instead of boosting economic growth, growth in Kansas remained consistently below average. A working paper by two economists at Oklahoma State University (Dan Rickman and Hongbo Wang) using historical data from several other states with economies structured similarly to Kansas found that the Kansas economy grew about 7.8% less and employment about 2.6% less than it would have had Brownback not cut taxes. In 2017, the Republican Legislature of Kansas voted to roll back the cuts, and after Brownback vetoed the repeal, overrode his veto.

According to Max Ehrenfreund, economists generally agree that an explanation for the reduction instead of increase in economic growth from the tax cuts is that "any" benefits from tax cuts come over the long, not short run, but what does come in the short run is a major decline in demand for goods and services. In the Kansas economy cuts in state government expenditures cut incomes of state government "employees, suppliers and contractors" who spent much or most of their incomes locally. In addition, concern over the state's large budget deficits "might have deterred businesses from making major new investments".

One problem Kansas encountered is that while studies have shown that tax cuts increase economic growth, the increased revenue from that growth at the new lower tax rates are only enough to make up for 10–30% of the tax cuts, meaning that to avoid deficits, spending cuts must also be made. Therefore, the experiment has been described as "fiscal austerity" by researchers at the Oklahoma State University who also concluded that Kansas experienced "negative economic multiplier effects from reduced state government spending... and increased economic uncertainty."

=== Trump years ===
Supply-side advocates Laffer and economics commentators Stephen Moore and Larry Kudlow played prominent roles in formulating Trump's economic policies by advising him on his tax cut, as well as encouraging him to lower trade barriers. Laffer and Moore wrote a 2018 book about the policy, Trumponomics, with a foreword by Kudlow. Economist Gregory Mankiw reviewed the book in Foreign Affairs, and characterized the statements around Trump's policies as "snake-oil economics". He criticized the authors for un-apologetically parroting the president's claimed annual growth rates spawned by his tax cut to be 1–4%, when the highest reasonable estimates were around 0.5%, but also credits them for continuing to support the consensus view that free trade is good for all, against the president's mercantilist views. He also criticized them for following a simplistic "economic growth will solve all problems" approach, when previous presidential economic advisors had been more nuanced, recognizing the unavoidable tradeoff between equity and efficiency in their approaches to managing the economy. Trump implemented individual and corporate income tax cuts which took effect in 2018. Rutgers economics professor Farrokh Langdana argued that the Trump tax cuts were an example of supply-side tax policy, citing a letter from economists long-associated with the supply-side theory describing them as such.

== Fiscal policy theory ==
One benefit of a supply-side policy is that shifting the aggregate supply curve outward means prices can be lowered along with expanding output and employment. This is in contrast to demand-side policies (e.g., higher government spending), which even if successful tend to create inflationary pressures (i.e., raise the aggregate price level) as the aggregate demand curve shifts outward. Infrastructure investment is an example of a policy that has both demand-side and supply-side elements.

Supply-side economics holds that increased taxation steadily reduces economic activity within a nation and discourages investment. Taxes act as a type of barrier to entry that causes economic participants to revert to less efficient means of satisfying their needs. As such, higher taxation leads to lower levels of specialization and lower economic efficiency. The idea is said to be illustrated by the Laffer curve.

Supply-side economists have less to say on the effects of deficits and sometimes cite Robert Barro's work that states that rational economic actors will buy bonds in sufficient quantities to reduce long-term interest rates.

== Effect on economic growth and tax revenues ==
Some contemporary economists do not consider supply-side economics a tenable economic theory, with Alan Blinder calling it an "ill-fated" and perhaps "silly" school on the pages of a 2006 textbook. Greg Mankiw, former chairman of President President George W. Bush's Council of Economic Advisers, offered similarly sharp criticism of the school in the early editions of his introductory economics textbook. "Tax cuts rarely pay for themselves. My reading of the academic literature leads me to believe that about one-third of the cost of a typical tax cut is recouped with faster economic growth."

Karl Case and Ray Fair wrote in Principles of Economics, "The extreme promises of supply-side economics did not materialize. President Reagan argued that because of the effect depicted in the Laffer curve, the government could maintain expenditures, cut tax rates, and balance the budget. This was not the case. Government revenues fell sharply from levels that would have been realized without the tax cuts."

Supply side proponents Trabandt and Uhlig argue that "static scoring overestimates the revenue loss for labor and capital tax cuts" and that "dynamic scoring" is a better predictor for the effects of tax cuts.

A 1999 study by University of Chicago economist Austan Goolsbee examined major changes in high-income tax rates in the United States from the 1920s onwards. It concluded that there were only modest changes in the reported income of high-income individuals, indicating that the tax changes had little effect on how much people work. He concluded that the notion that governments could raise more money by cutting rates "is unlikely to be true at anything like today's marginal tax rates". In 2015, one study found that in the past several decades, tax cuts in the U.S. seldom recouped revenue losses and had minimal impact on GDP growth.

A 2008 working paper found that in the case of Russia, "tax rate cuts can increase revenues by improving tax compliance."

The New Palgrave Dictionary of Economics reports that estimates of revenue-maximizing tax rates have varied widely, with a mid-range of around 70%.

Critics of supply-side policies emphasize the growing federal deficits, increased income inequality and lack of growth. They argue that the Laffer curve only measures the rate of taxation, not tax incidence, which may be a stronger predictor of whether a tax code change is stimulative or dampening. In a 1992 article for the Harvard International Review, James Tobin wrote: "The 'Laffer curve' idea that tax cuts would actually increase revenues turned out to deserve the ridicule."

According to studies that analyzed the tax cuts in 2001 (EGTRRA): the decrease in taxes have provided a generally positive impact on the future output from the effect of the lower tax rates on human capital accumulation, private saving and investment, labor supply; however, the tax cuts have produced adverse effects such as higher deficits and reduced national savings. Thus, Gale and Potter (2002) concluded that these tax cuts could not affect the GDP levels in any significant way in the next 10 years.

=== 1920s tax cuts ===
Proponents of supply-side economics have sometimes cited tax cuts enacted in the 1920s as evidence that tax cuts can increase tax revenue. According to the Cato Institute, after World War I, the highest tax bracket, which was for those earning over $100,000 a year (worth at least $1 million a year now), was over 70 percent. According to The Heritage Foundation, revenue acts of 1921, 1924 and 1926 reduced this tax rate to less than 25 percent, yet tax revenues actually went up significantly. Tax historian Joseph Thorndike argues that the tax cuts helped "bolster" growth but did not "cover the full cost of those tax cuts".

=== Revenue Act of 1964 ===
Proponents of supply-side economics sometimes cite tax cuts enacted by President Lyndon B. Johnson with the Revenue Act of 1964. John F. Kennedy had the year prior advocated a drastic tax-rate cut in 1963 when the top income tax rate was 91%, arguing that "[t]ax rates are too high today and tax revenues too low, and the soundest way to raise revenues in the long run is to cut rates now". The CBO concluded in 1978 that the tax cuts reduced tax revenue by $12 billion and that only between $3 billion to $9 billion were recaptured due to bolstered economic growth. According to the CBO, "most of this rise [in revenues] was due to economic growth that would have taken place even without the tax cut."

At the same time, some studies have found a relatively robust response to tax cuts from the top 5% of tax returns. There has been identified an increase of 7.7% in revenues from the top 5%, from $17.17 billion US in 1963 to $18.49 billion in 1965. Hereby, the data have provided evidence that the group has been in the prohibitive part of the Laffer curve, because its input to total tax revenues have increased despite the tax rates decreasing significantly.

=== Reaganomics ===
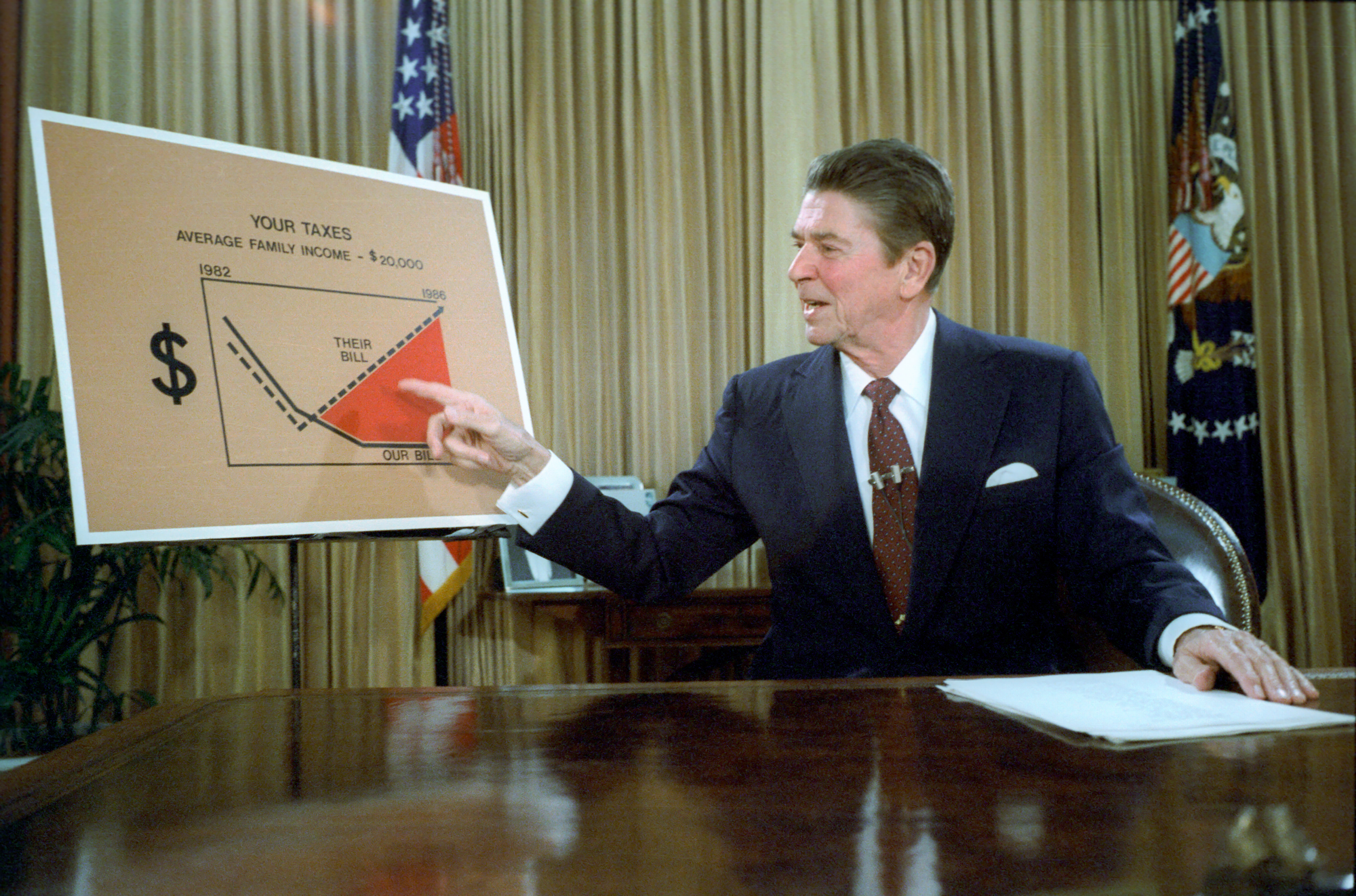
Ronald Reagan gives a televised address from the Oval Office, outlining his plan for tax reductions in July 1981.

Supply-siders justified Reagan's tax cuts during the 1980s by claiming they would result in net increases in tax revenue, yet tax revenues declined (relative to a baseline without the cuts) due to Reagan's tax cuts, and the deficit ballooned during Reagan's term in office. The Treasury Department studied the Reagan tax cuts and concluded they significantly reduced tax revenues relative to a baseline without them. The 1990 budget by the Reagan administration concluded that the 1981 tax cuts had caused a reduction in tax revenue.

Both CBO and the Reagan Administration forecast that individual and business income tax revenues would be lower if the Reagan tax cut proposals were implemented, relative to a policy baseline without those cuts, by about $50 billion in 1982 and $210 billion by 1986. FICA tax revenue increased because in 1983 FICA tax rates were increased from 6.7% to 7% and the ceiling was raised by $2,100. For the self-employed, the FICA tax rate went from 9.35% to 14%. The FICA tax rate increased throughout Reagan's term and rose to 7.51% in 1988 and the ceiling was raised by 61% through Reagan's two terms. Those tax hikes on wage earners, along with inflation, were the source of revenue gains in the early 1980s.

It has been contended by some supply-side critics that the argument to lower taxes to increase revenues was a smokescreen for "starving" the government of revenues in the hope that the tax cuts would lead to a corresponding drop in government spending, but this did not turn out to be the case. Paul Samuelson called this notion "the tape worm theory—the idea that the way to get rid of a tape worm is [to] stab your patient in the stomach".

There is frequent confusion on the meaning of the term "supply-side economics" between the related ideas of the existence of the Laffer Curve and the belief that decreasing tax rates can increase tax revenues. Many supply-side economists doubt the latter claim while still supporting the general policy of tax cuts. Economist Gregory Mankiw used the term "fad economics" to describe the notion of tax rate cuts increasing revenue in the third edition of his 2007 Principles of Macroeconomics textbook in a section entitled "Charlatans and Cranks":

An example of fad economics occurred in 1980, when a small group of economists advised Presidential candidate, Ronald Reagan, that an across-the-board cut in income tax rates would raise tax revenue. They argued that if people could keep a higher fraction of their income, people would work harder to earn more income. Even though tax rates would be lower, income would rise by so much, they claimed, that tax revenues would rise. Almost all professional economists, including most of those who supported Reagan's proposal to cut taxes, viewed this outcome as far too optimistic. Lower tax rates might encourage people to work harder and this extra effort would offset the direct effects of lower tax rates to some extent, but there was no credible evidence that work effort would rise by enough to cause tax revenues to rise in the face of lower tax rates. [...] People on fad diets put their health at risk but rarely achieve the permanent weight loss they desire. Similarly, when politicians rely on the advice of charlatans and cranks, they rarely get the desirable results they anticipate. After Reagan's election, Congress passed the cut in tax rates that Reagan advocated, but the tax cut did not cause tax revenues to rise.

In 1986, Martin Feldstein – a self-described "traditional supply sider" who served as Reagan's chairman of the Council of Economic Advisors from 1982 to 1984 – characterized the "new supply siders" who emerged circa 1980:

What distinguished the new supply siders from the traditional supply siders as the 1980s began was not the policies they advocated but the claims that they made for those policies ... The "new" supply siders were much more extravagant in their claims. They projected rapid growth, dramatic increases in tax revenue, a sharp rise in saving, and a relatively painless reduction in inflation. The height of supply side hyperbole was the "Laffer curve" proposition that the tax cut would actually increase tax revenue because it would unleash an enormously depressed supply of effort. Another remarkable proposition was the claim that even if the tax cuts did lead to an increased budget deficit, that would not reduce the funds available for investment in plant and equipment because tax changes would raise the saving rate by enough to finance the increased deficit ... Nevertheless, I have no doubt that the loose talk of the supply side extremists gave fundamentally good policies a bad name and led to quantitative mistakes that not only contributed to subsequent budget deficits but that also made it more difficult to modify policy when those deficits became apparent.

Writing in 2010, John Quiggin said, "To the extent that there was an economic response to the Reagan tax cuts, and to those of George W. Bush twenty years later, it seems largely to have been a Keynesian demand-side response, to be expected when governments provide households with additional net income in the context of a depressed economy."

=== Bush tax cuts ===
During his presidency, President Bush signed the Economic Growth and Tax Relief Reconciliation Act of 2001 and Jobs and Growth Tax Relief Reconciliation Act of 2003, which entailed significant tax cuts. In 2003, the Congressional Budget Office conducted a dynamic scoring analysis of tax cuts advocated by supply advocates, and found that the Bush tax cuts would not pay for themselves. Two of the nine models used in the study predicted a large improvement in the deficit over the next ten years resulting from tax cuts, but only by making the assumption that people would work harder from 2004 to 2014 because they believed that tax rates would increase again in 2014, and they wanted to make more money before the tax cuts expired.

In 2006, the CBO released a study titled "A Dynamic Analysis of Permanent Extension of the President's Tax Relief". This study found that under the best possible scenario making tax cuts permanent would increase the economy "over the long run" by 0.7%. This study was criticized by many economists, including Harvard Economics Professor Greg Mankiw, who pointed out that the CBO used a very low value for the earnings-weighted compensated labor supply elasticity of 0.14. In a paper published in the Journal of Public Economics, Mankiw and Matthew Weinzierl noted that the current economics research would place an appropriate value for labor supply elasticity at around 0.5.

The Congressional Budget Office (CBO) estimated that extending the Bush tax cuts beyond their 2010 expiration would increase the deficit by $1.8 trillion over 10 years. The CBO also completed a study in 2005 analyzing a hypothetical 10% income tax cut and concluded that under various scenarios there would be minimal offsets to the loss of revenue. In other words, deficits would increase by nearly the same amount as the tax cut in the first five years with limited feedback revenue thereafter.

Nobel laureate economist Milton Friedman agreed the tax cuts would reduce tax revenues and result in intolerable deficits, though he supported them as a means to restrain federal spending. Friedman characterized the reduced government tax revenue as "cutting their allowance".

Douglas Holtz-Eakin was a Bush administration economist who was appointed director of the Congressional Budget Office in 2003. Under his leadership, the CBO undertook a study of income tax rates which found that any new revenue from tax cuts paled in comparison to their cost.

Dartmouth economics professor Andrew Samwick was the chief staff economist for the Bush Council of Economic Advisers from July 2003 to July 2004. Writing on his blog in 2007, Samwick urged his former colleagues in the Bush administration to avoid asserting that the Bush tax cuts paid for themselves, because "No thoughtful person believes it...Not a single one."

=== Trump tax cuts ===
Referring to the Trump tax cuts of 2018, The New York Times stated "Ten months after the law took effect, that promised “supply-side” bump is harder to find than the sugar-high stimulus."

Analysis conducted by the Congressional Research Service on the first-year effect of the tax cut said "the tax law’s effects on the economy were smaller than those predicted by a slew of forecasters and added that the economy’s growth was not consistent “with the direction and size of the supply-side incentive effects one would expect from the tax changes.”.

White House economic advisor Larry Kudlow had characterized the tax cuts as "our supply-side tax cuts.", and one year after the tax cut, falsely asserted that federal revenues had increased about 10%, when they had in fact slightly declined.

== See also ==
- Austerity – Economic policies intended to reduce government budget deficits
- Fiscal conservatism – Political and economic philosophy
- Gold standard – Monetary system based on the value of gold
- Mellonomics – Economic policies of Andrew Mellon
- Monetarism – School of thought in monetary economics
- Price elasticity of supply – Measure in economics
- Supply-side progressivism – Political ideology
- Thatcherism – British conservative ideology from the 1980s onward
- Trickle-down economics – Economic and political term
