= A2S =

A2S may refer to:

- Amazon Associates Web Service, now known as Amazon Product Advertising API
- Assist-2-Sell
