= IDrive (disambiguation) =

iDrive may refer to:

- iDrive, a BMW vehicle control system
- International Drive, a road in Orlando, Florida, US
- IDrive Inc., based in Los Angeles County, US

== See also ==
- iDisk, an Apple file hosting service
- i-drive, (1998-2000), based in San Francisco, US
