= James M. Poterba =

American economist (born 1958)

Jim Poterba
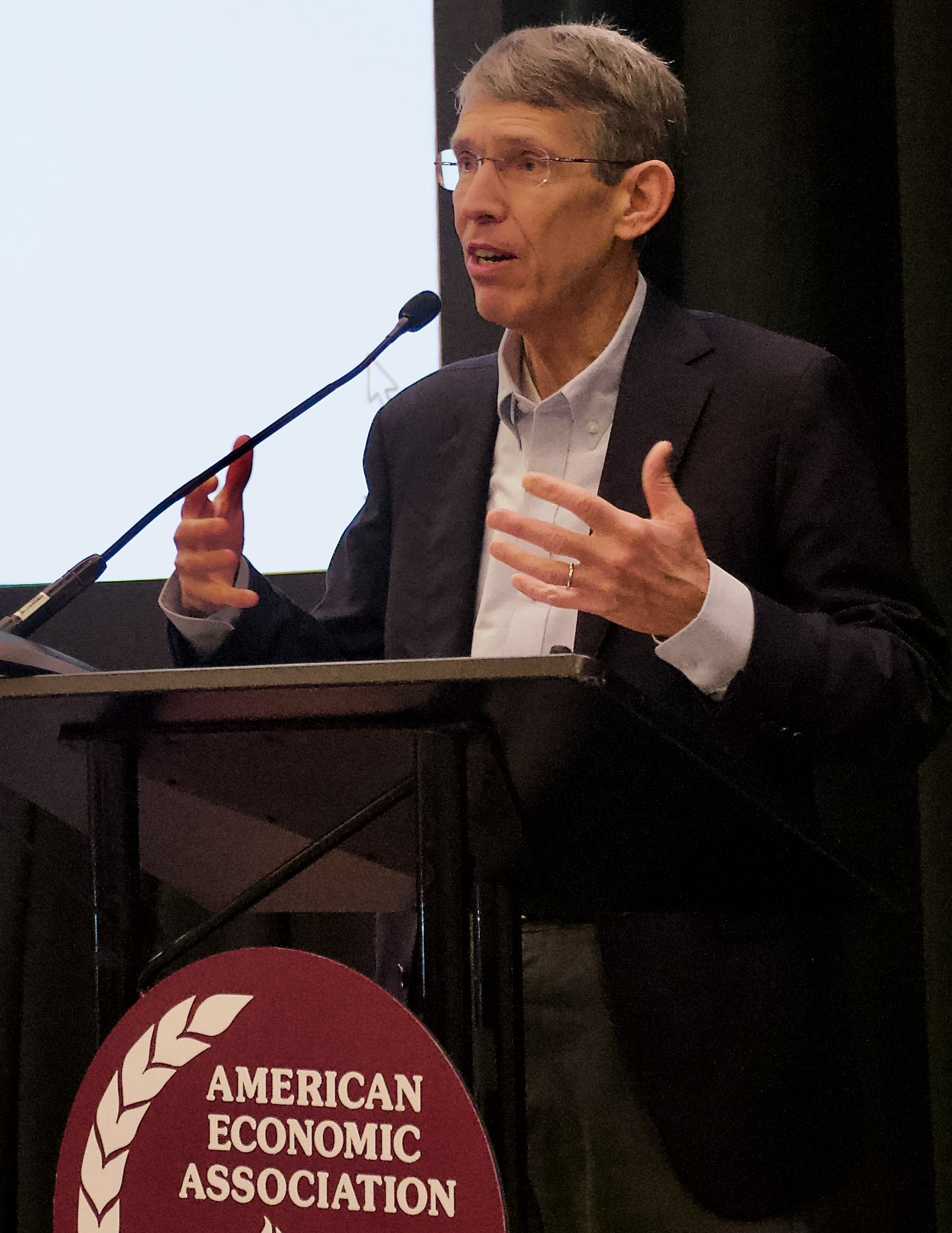
- Born: July 13, 1958 (age 68); New York City, U.S.
- Spouse: Nancy Rose

Academic background
- Education: Harvard University (BA); Nuffield College, Oxford (MPhil, DPhil)
- Influences: Martin Feldstein

Academic work
- Discipline: Public economics
- Institutions: Massachusetts Institute of Technology
- Doctoral students: David Cutler; Luigi Zingales; Andrew Samwick; Alan Gerber; Caroline Hoxby; Steven Levitt; Emmanuel Saez; Amy Finkelstein; Stefanie Stantcheva
- Awards: NAS Award for Scientific Reviewing (1997); Daniel M. Holland Medal (2014)
- Website: Information at IDEAS / RePEc

James Michael "Jim" Poterba, FBA is an American economist who is the Mitsui Professor of Economics at the Massachusetts Institute of Technology, and current National Bureau of Economic Research president and chief executive officer.

== Early life and education ==
Poterba was born in New York City. He attended Pennsbury High School in Pennsylvania, where he won the 1976 championship of the National Forensic League in policy debate. He completed his A.B., summa cum laude, in 1980 from Harvard University and completed his PhD in 1983 from Nuffield College, Oxford. He was a Marshall Scholar.

== Academic career ==
Poterba started his career as an instructor in economics at the Massachusetts Institute of Technology. He became Professor of Economics at MIT in 1988. Today, he is the Mitsui Professor of Economics. He became the president of the National Bureau of Economic Research on 1 July 2008.

== Research ==
Poterba is known for his research on how taxation affects the economic decisions of households and firms. His research has emphasized the effect of taxation on the financial behavior of households, particularly their saving and portfolio decisions. He is also interested in the analysis of tax-deferred retirement saving programs such as 401(k) plans and in the role of annuities in financing retirement consumption.

He has also been Director of the NBER Public Economics Research Program since 1991. He has served as a member of the President's Advisory Panel on Federal Tax Reform and edited the Journal of Public Economics, the leading international journal for research on taxation and government spending, between 1997 and 2006. He has edited several economics journals.

== Honors ==
He was elected a Fellow of the American Academy of Arts and Sciences in 1996. In 1999 Poterba was awarded the NAS Award for Scientific Reviewing from the National Academy of Sciences.

In July 2017, Poterba was elected a Corresponding Fellow of the British Academy (FBA), the United Kingdom's national academy for the humanities and social sciences.

== Personal life ==
Poterba is married to economist Nancy Rose.
