= Delta (emulator) =

Mobile video game console emulator

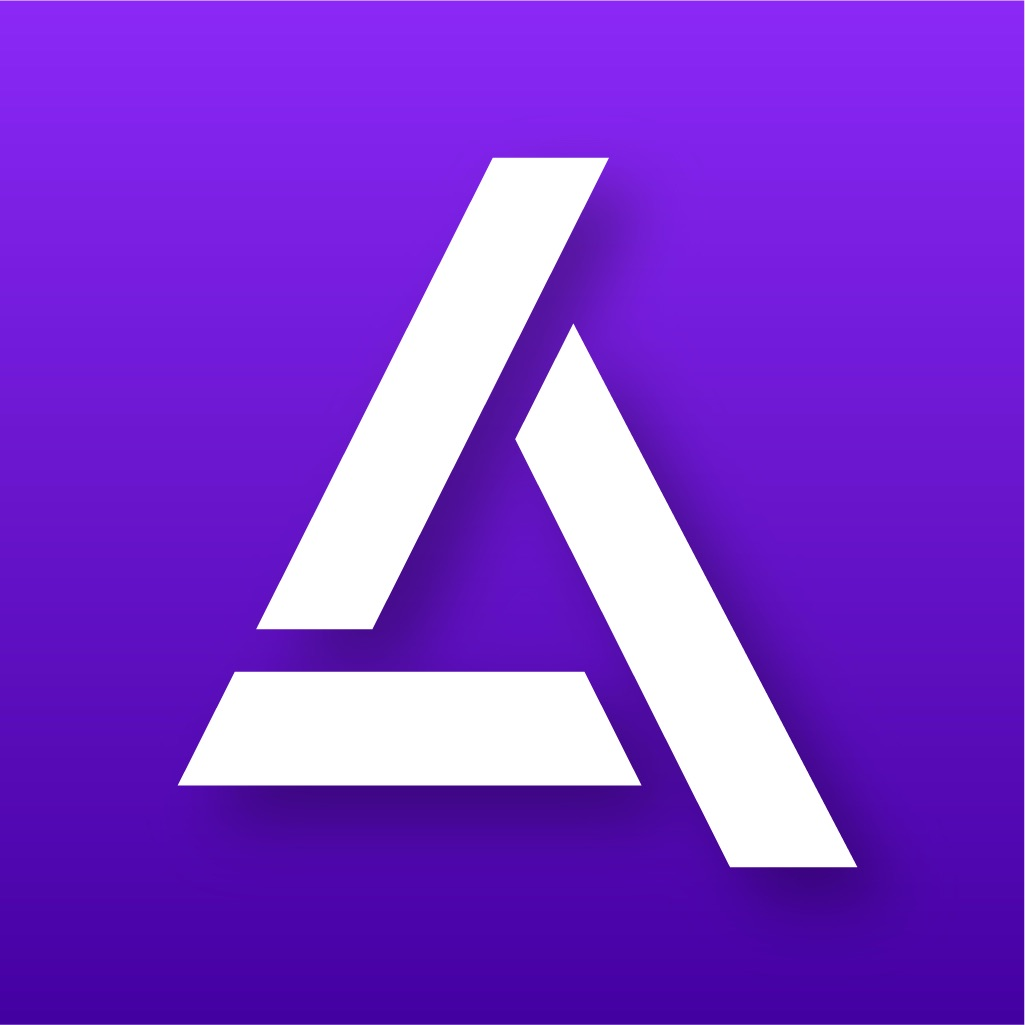

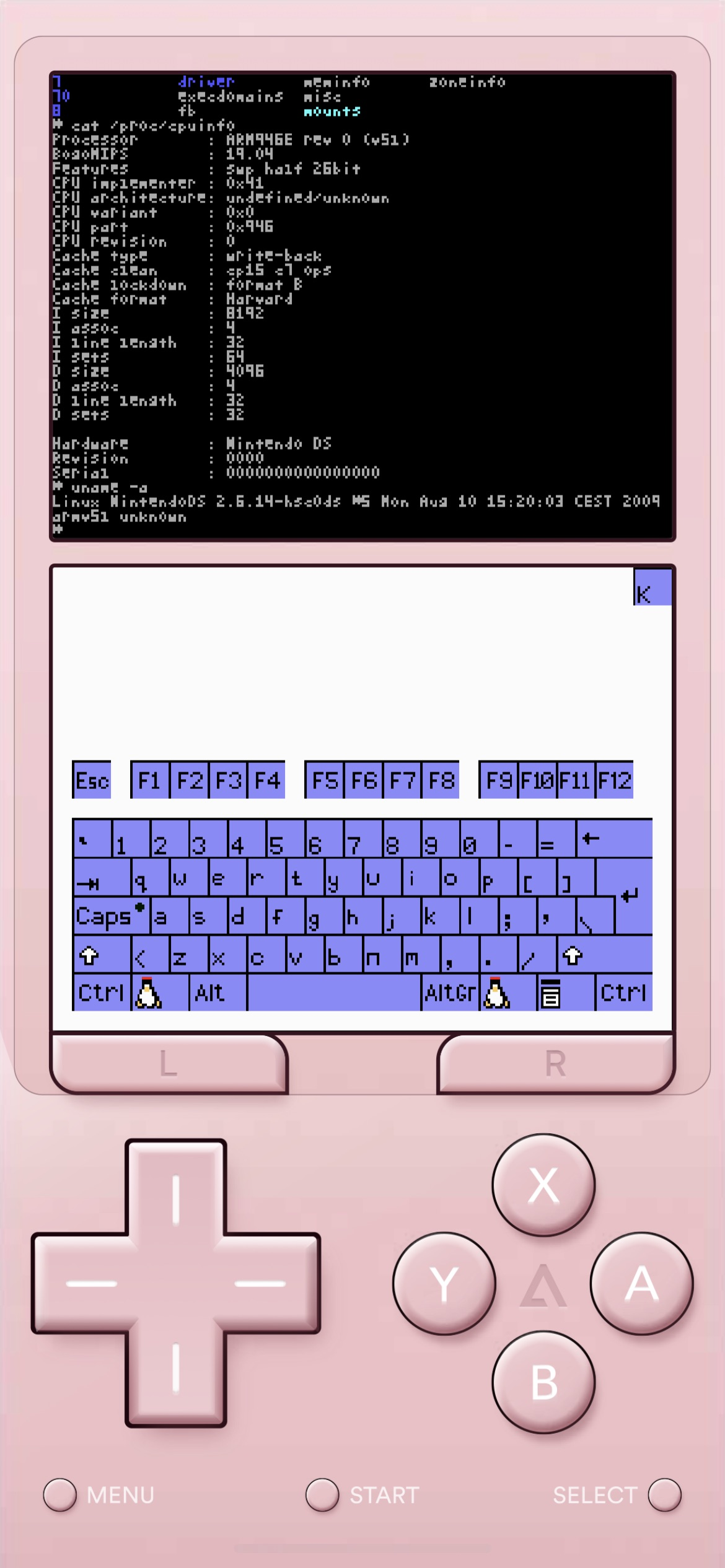
- Screenshot DSLinux, a port of Linux to the Nintendo DS running on the Delta emulator
- Original author: Riley Testut
- Developer: Riley Testut et al.
- Release: September 28, 2019; 7 years ago (AltStore); April 17, 2024; 2 years ago (App Store)
- Written in: Swift
- Operating system: iOS iPadOS
- Platform: iPhone iPad
- Predecessor: GBA4iOS
- Type: Video game console emulator
- License: GNU Affero General Public License 3.0
- Website: deltaemulator.com
- Repository: github.com/rileytestut/Delta

Delta is a video game console emulator created by Riley Testut for iOS and iPadOS. It supports games for the Super Nintendo Entertainment System, Nintendo Entertainment System, Nintendo 64, Nintendo DS, Game Boy, Game Boy Color, Game Boy Advance, and Sega Genesis games. Development of Delta started prior to Testut entering university, with it being a successor to the earlier GBA4iOS application. Prior to the application's release on the App Store, iOS users had to download Delta via AltStore, Testut's app store for the iOS and iPadOS operating systems. Upon release onto the App Store in April 2024, the app reached the top of the App Store rankings for about two weeks.

== Background ==
Riley Testut started developing GBA4iOS, the predecessor of Delta, during his senior year at Richardson High School along with his friend Paul Thorsen. It was an emulator of the Game Boy Advance for the iPhone. iOS users had to sideload the emulator via an exploit named the "Date Trick", where the app is allowed to be downloaded and installed via the Safari browser, without needing to jailbreak (i.e. using exploits to bypass software restrictions) the device.

On October 8, 2014, the exploit was patched in the iOS 8.1 update, thus ending the lifespan of the software. The source code for the app is currently hosted on Bitbucket.

== Development and release ==
Development of Delta started prior to Testut entering the University of Southern California. He released the emulator in 2019 alongside the AltStore app marketplace for iOS and iPadOS. Testut claimed that he developed the application because he wanted to publish the emulator. AltStore serves as an alternative to jailbreaking.

Before Delta was released on Apple's App Store in 2024, the only way to install it was through AltStore. Apple did not allow software emulators in their App Store. In 2024, due to pressure from the EU Digital Markets Act, Apple changed their rules to allow emulators. After the change, a copycat emulator called iGBA (a fork of GBA4iOS) was released to the App Store. Apple took down iGBA shortly after it was released. Testut described iGBA as a "knock-off" of the Delta emulator. He also stated that he had not given permission to the developer of iGBA to publish the application.

Delta was officially released on the App Store on April 17, 2024. It reached the top of the digital marketplace's charts almost immediately following release. This would be short-lived, however, as the Krispy Kreme app surpassed Delta just two weeks later after they announced that they would give twelve donuts for free for people who downloaded the app in the USA.

In mid-2024, the emulator changed its logo after Adobe threatened Testut with legal action due to its original logo sharing an almost identical similarity.

== Supported consoles ==
Delta can emulate the consoles listed below:

| Console | Emulator used |
|---|---|
| Nintendo Entertainment System | Nestopia |
| Super Nintendo Entertainment System | Snes9x |
| Nintendo 64 | Mupen64Plus |
| Game Boy / Color | Gambatte |
| Game Boy Advance | VisualBoyAdvance |
| Nintendo DS | MelonDS |
| Sega Genesis | Genesis Plus GX |
