= Fiona Scott Morton =

American economist

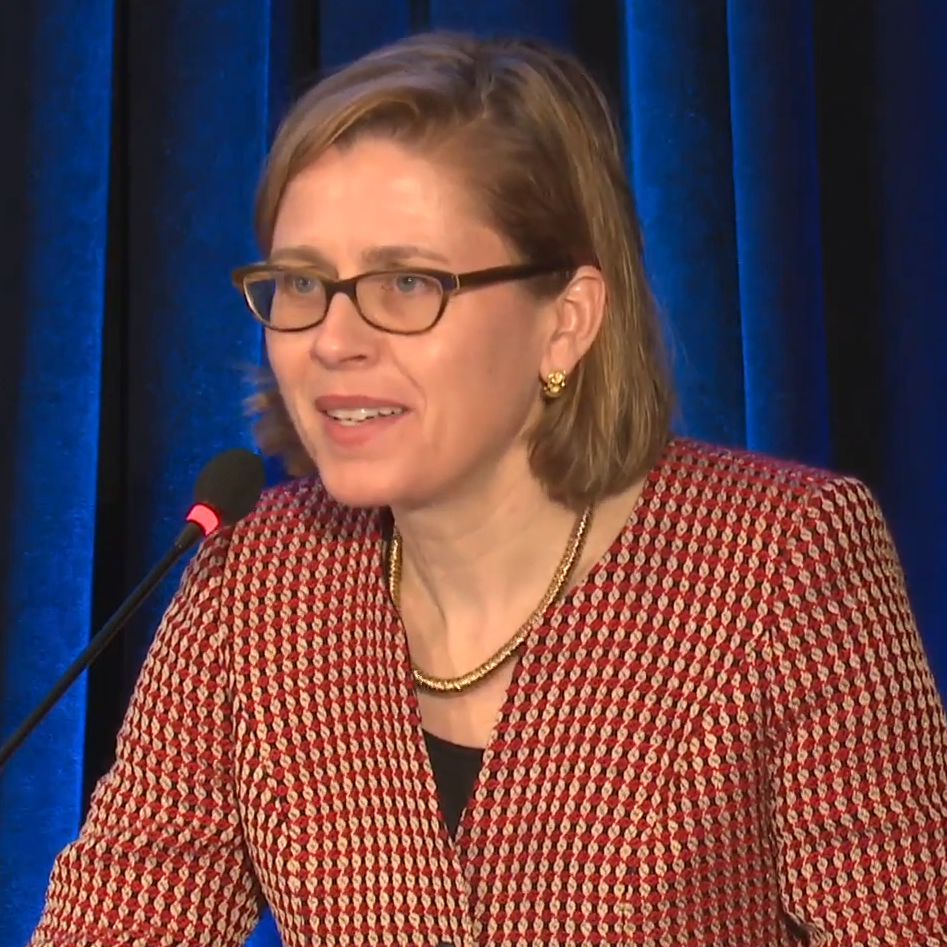
- Born: February 20, 1967 (age 59)
- Organization(s): Yale University; Charles River Associates

Academic background
- Education: Yale University (BA); Massachusetts Institute of Technology (MA, PhD)
- Doctoral advisor: Nancy Rose

Fiona M. Scott Morton (born 20 February 1967) is an American economist who serves as the Theodore Nierenberg Professor at Yale School of Management. Her research in industrial organization has covered industries including magazines, shipping, pharmaceuticals, and internet retail. She served as associate dean of the Yale School of Management from 2007 to 2010.

From 2011 to 2012, she served as the Deputy Assistant Attorney General for Economics at the United States Department of Justice Antitrust Division. In her academic work, she has advocated for the U.S. government's role in ensuring healthy competition in healthcare markets and the tech industry. Scott Morton is a consultant to the competition practice at the economics consulting firm CRA International in parallel with work as professor. Scott Morton is the director of the Thurman Arnold Project at Yale.

She was appointed Chief Economist of the European Commission's Directorate-General for Competition, an appointment that was supposed to take effect on September 1, 2023. Following her appointment, concerns were raised over her history of advising big U.S. technology companies such as Apple and Amazon, and that she was not a citizen of the E.U. But a group of 39 economists issued a statement supporting Scott Morton’s appointment. As a result of the controversy, Scott Morton withdrew from consideration in July 2023.

Starting in 2020, Scott Morton became the subject of controversies related to undisclosed payments from large corporations, while advising the US Congress and while nominated for a position to advise the EU on antitrust. As of early 2025, she was also a senior fellow at Bruegel.

== Early life and education ==
Scott Morton grew up in Lexington, Massachusetts, where she attended the public school system. She graduated from Yale in 1989 with a Bachelor of Arts magna cum laude in economics (spending a year abroad at Clare College, Cambridge) and then went on to get a Ph.D. in economics at MIT in 1994.

== Career ==
=== Early career ===
Scott Morton's first academic job was at the Stanford Graduate School of Business, where she worked for three years before moving the Chicago Graduate School of Business (now known as Booth). In 1999 she became an associate professor at the Yale School of Management, where she has taught ever since. She was promoted to Full Professor in 2003, has served as Associate Dean, and has won the Yale School of Management's Alumni Association Elective Teaching Award three times.

=== Department of Justice ===
In May 2011 Scott Morton took public service leave from Yale to serve as Deputy Assistant Attorney General for Economic Analysis for the Antitrust Division of the United States Department of Justice. In this position she oversaw a team of almost fifty economists to investigate mergers, analyze monopolization cases, and carry out competition policy work.

During that time the Antitrust Division blocked the merger between H&R Block and TaxAct as well as AT&T and T-Mobile. The AnheiserBusch-GrupoModelo merger, which resulted in the divestiture of the US operations of GrupoModelo, and the Apple-eBooks case started while Scott Morton was chief economist.

=== Relation to Chicago School economics ===
Scott Morton's views depart from assumptions posited by the “Chicago School” of antitrust. According to Scott Morton, "The Chicago School colonized the field in the 1980s. Few in the judiciary or enforcement communities wanted to vigorously enforce the antitrust laws. The Chicago folks made that worse by using [decades-old] economics, which conveniently left out many of the tools you need to get the job done properly.”

The Chicago School places great weight on the ability of entrants to enter and overthrow an established incumbent regardless of entry barriers, scale economies, network effects and the like, resulting in markets operating at peak efficiency without any need for enforcement. Similarly, little enforcement is needed in mergers either because they are assumed to generate great efficiencies. By contrast, Scott Morton stresses that even very simple models of competition illustrate the incentive for monopolists become established and remain entrenched in the absence of enforcement; and for capitalism to work and benefit regular consumers there must be “rules of the road.”

According to her sometime co-author Steve Salop, Scott Morton is a leading figure in the so-called "post-Chicago" group that has forged "a coherent body of work that can be used by policymakers and advocates.”

According to Scott Morton, “The economic tool kit lets you say, 'Look here, I have identified a new competition problem that is harming consumers.' A lawyer’s response is often, 'That’s a new product, market, or problem. It doesn’t fit existing precedent and we don’t know how to use our legal tools to challenge it.' I realized that very few people in the policy world thought that fixing that second step was their job. Nor did academics."

=== Prominent research ===
Scott Morton has expressed her frustration with the “cramped” thinking on competition topics that has prevailed during the 1980-2010 period. Entering a field in which government representatives reflexively touted the importance of moderation, Scott Morton rapidly became known as an advocate for bold action in the pursuit of anticompetitive measures. Scott Morton's influential 2014 paper "Strategic Patent Acquisitions," co-authored with Carl Shapiro, explains that when Standard Setting Organizations (technical bodies that gather to set standards like 4G) allow the exercise of market power by the patents needed in the standard (SEPs) they are effectively an anticompetitive cartel that could be disciplined by antitrust enforcement.

In 2017, in "A Unifying Analytical Framework for Loyalty Rebates," which appeared in Antitrust Law Journal, Scott Morton and Zachary Abrahamson explained that loyalty discounts and rebates may potentially run afoul of antitrust statutes because they explicitly exclude a challenger who is growing and stealing share from the incumbent. The authors developed a metric called “effective entrant burden” to measure the degree to which a firm leverages its non-contestable assets into anti-competitive exclusion.

In 2018, in the Yale Law Journal, Scott Morton and Jonathan B. Baker authored a paper titled “The Antitrust Case Against Platform MFNs” in which they took up "platform MFN" status as a topic of potential antitrust enforcement attention. Platform MFNs, sometimes called pricing parity provisions, are often seen in hotel-online travel agent relationships, healthcare provider-insurer relationships, and ecommerce platforms. The platform requires that the business users in its network desist from offering their products or services at a lower price (or with better terms) on their own sites or on other platforms. The authors review the long economics literature showing that these arrangements cause higher prices and block entry, and argue that the Sherman Act might well be used to challenge them.

In the same issue of the Yale Law Journal, Scott Morton and Herbert Hovenkamp contributed a paper, "Horizontal Shareholding and Antitrust Policy," in which they argued that large institutional investors who hold stakes in direct competitors pose a competition problem than could be addressed by antitrust enforcement. Such “horizontal shareholding” or “common ownership” may lessen competition because the same owner of, for example, Coke and Pepsi would benefit from higher prices in the market.

In 2019, Scott Morton and her co-authors Shapiro and Giulio Federico wrote an article titled “Antitrust and Innovation: Welcoming and Protecting Disruption” in which they discussed the importance of innovation competition, reiterating its importance in generating consumer welfare.

In the same year Scott Morton and her coauthors Jonathan Baker, Nancy Rose, and Steve Salop authored an article for the journal Antitrust called “Five Principles for Vertical Merger Enforcement Policy.”

In 2019, Scott Morton led a group of eight economists in study for the Stigler Center at the University of Chicago, which resulted in a report recommending the creation of a new regulating body that could supplement traditional antitrust regulators by moving more quickly to maintain competition in online industries.

In 2019, Scott Morton began her leadership of the Thurman Arnold Project, named after an influential Yale law professor who, in the 1940s, established the modern form of the Antitrust Division and popularized enforcement.

On April 30, 2020, Scott Morton and 11 other well-known economists authored an open letter to the House Judiciary Committee outlining the legal developments that limit the success of meritorious antitrust plaintiffs, both in merger challenges and exclusionary conduct. The letter called on Congress to implement strong antitrust reform in the United States.

In the spring of 2020, Scott Morton and David Dinielli authored three “roadmap” articles relying on public information and facts released by the Competition and Markets Authority in the UK. These articles explained the economics underlying the conduct of Facebook. Google Search, and Google ad tech, The articles argue that in each of those three instances, a viable antitrust case could be brought under existing law.

In 2021 Scott Morton and Steven Salop in an article titled “The 2010 HMGs After Ten Years: Where Do We Go From Here?” warned of problems arising from mergers that generate a Gross Upward Pricing Pressure Index (GUPPI) of greater than 10% and proposed reversing the increase in the Herfindahl-Hirschman index thresholds made in the 2010 guidelines.

In 2021 Scott Morton and Susan Athey co-authored a paper titled "Platform Annexation." The paper illustrated a series of strategies digital platforms use to disadvantage rival firms and maintain their own position as market leaders.

== Undisclosed conflict of interest controversy ==
Scott Morton advised the US House Judiciary Committee in its 2019 probe of tech giants. She contributed to reports critical of Facebook and Google, while not disclosing that Apple and Amazon were her clients.

In 2020, the American Prospect magazine revealed that Scott Morton did not disclose consulting contracts with Apple and Amazon. The article in the American Prospect was written by David Dayen, the journalist who labelled Scott Morton an antitrust crusader a year earlier. Dayen reported that Scott Morton had herself revealed her apparently long-standing consulting work for Apple and consulting work for Amazon that had at that point lasted a year, in a panel where she spoke in 2020.

In another instance, Scott Morton authored an op-ed advocating against any initiatives to break up Big Tech, without disclosing her ongoing consulting work for Apple. In response, Scott Morton stated, “I work for companies that I’m comfortable are not breaking the law.”

At the time of the revelations on the undisclosed conflicts of interest, Scott Morton was the director of the Thurman Arnold Project at the Yale University. In the wake of the revelations about Scott Morton's undisclosed conflicts of interest, two fellows of the Thurman Arnold Project, Sanjukta Paul and Stacey Mitchell, resigned. Stacey Mitchell indicated that she resigned because Scott Morton's paid for advisory work for Apple and Amazon made it difficult for the project to achieve its objective and was at odds with the legacy of Thurman Arnold.

In a Promarket.org article dated November 2023 showcasing the opinions of four antitrust experts, including Scott Morton, it is asserted that Scott Morton's "Amazon engagement ended more than two years ago," meaning in 2021 or earlier. In the article, Scott Morton referred to Amazon's use of "platform MFNs" as "aggressive" because they "block entry by rival platforms, who can’t compete on price, and thus cause higher prices." In the period following the unsuccessful bid to run the Directorate General for Competition, Scott Morton has written several articles and papers in support of regulation of Apple and Amazon.

She has praised the European Union's Digital Markets Act (DMA) because it forces Apple and Google "to share the technical specifications of their interfaces with developers and offer them the same functionalities they give to their own stores." Elsewhere she wrote that "new enforcement [on Amazon] may be needed." The US, she wrote, should adopt the principles of the DMA because "it should restore competition with minimal harmful side effects."

== Appointment to EU position and withdrawal ==
On July 11, 2023, the European Commission Vice-president and Commissioner for Competition Margrethe Vestager announced the appointment of Scott Morton as the new chief economist of the EU's Competition Directorate. A “senior official” was quoted as calling Scott Morton “the best of the 11 candidates." Scott Morton had the support of Ursula von der Leyen, president of the European Commission. On July 19, Vestager announced that Scott Morton had submitted a letter of withdrawal. In the letter Scott Morton stated: “Given the political controversy that has arisen because of the selection of a non-European to fill this position, and the importance that the Directorate General has the full backing of the European Union as it enforces, I have determined that the best course of action is for me to withdraw and not take up the chief economist position.”

=== Concerns about conflicts of interest prevailed ===
Following an article in Bloomberg hinting at the upcoming appointment of Scott Morton, some European Commission officials, the European Parliament political groups of Renew Europe, the European People's Party, the Progressive Alliance of Socialists and Democrats and the Greens/European Free Alliance, requested that the commission reconsider the appointment due to alleged conflicts of interest related to Scott Morton’s advisory roles with big technology companies, and because she was not a citizen of the European Union. Some economists however spoke out in favor of Morton over her credentials. Among the points raised by the groups were concerns regarding Scott Morton's work at the economic consultancy firm CRA, where she served as an advisor to big tech companies, including Apple and Amazon. In response, Scott Morton stated, “I work for companies that I’m comfortable are not breaking the law.” Scott Morton was supported by a group of 39 economists, including Olivier Blanchard and Nobel laureate Bengt Holmström, who issued a statement endorsing her appointment. However, as a result of the opposition, Scott Morton withdrew her name from consideration in July 2023.

On 18 July 2023, the European Parliament summoned Vestager for a hearing on the appointment of Scott Morton. The hearing centered around the extensive conflicts of interest of Scott Morton, focusing on her consulting work for Big Tech. The conflicts were such that Vestager was not able at the hearing to give an exhaustive list, when asked repeatedly by the Members of the European Parliament.

=== Opposition by French politicians ===
French President Emmanuel Macron quickly raised objections to the appointment. “Isn’t there a European researcher who can do this job?” he asked. “If that’s the conclusion we’re drawing, it’s extremely worrying, and we need to invest massively in the academic systems of our economies.” Macron found support from French foreign minister Catherine Colonna and French Minister for Digital Transition and Telecommunications Jean-Noël Barrot as well as Cristiano Sebastiani, head of Renouveau & Démocratie, a trade union representing EU employees.

On July 17, 2023, Le Monde published an editorial opposing the selection and criticizing Vestager.

=== Selection procedure issues ===
In May 2023, Balanced Economy Project, Corporate Europe Observatory, European Digital SME Alliance, the Irish Council for Civil Liberties, LobbyControl and Open Markets Institute pointed out in their open letter addressed to Vestager, that the recruitment rules for the chief economist post have been altered ahead of the Scott Morton possible nomination. Under prior rules only candidates from the countries of the EU could apply for the job, the change in the job advertisement, that allowed Scott Morton to apply was not explained.

The choice of Scott Morton was ultimately validated by the college of all European Commissioners, including 5 members of the college of European commissioners that later contested the nomination.

=== Economists rally behind Scott Morton ===
French economist Jean Tirole stated that Europe was "very lucky to have drawn someone of her caliber," calling her a global leader "in the domain of industrial organization." According to a Commission official, some of the 11 candidates "didn't have the minimum qualifications required." On July 17 a statement signed by 39 top competition experts, including Nobel Prize winner Bengt Holmstrom and French economist Olivier Blanchard, was distributed urging the EU to stick with Morton. "Scott Morton is one of the best economists in the world in the domain of industrial organization, a major contributor to policy thinking on tech regulation, and strongly motivated for public service," they added, and the commission should "recruit the best possible collaborators in the service of European citizens, independently of their nationality."

=== Broader political reactions to the Scott Morton "affair" ===
The withdrawal of Morton led to mixed reactions among European politicians. Among Members of the European Parliament, Stéphanie Yon-Courtin and Paul Tang welcomed the withdrawal. Kira Peter-Hansen and Rasmus Andresen from the European Green Party expressed concerns that the decision was driven by nationalism. In its Charlemagne section dedicated to coverage of European affairs, The Economist quickly weighed in on what it called a "sorry saga." The Economist wrote in an opinion piece that the French push to oust Morton made “the EU look provincial" and "a continent lacking in economic dynamism" that might someday find it worth "importing" sound policymaking expertise.

In Politico, Lionel Barber linked the French-led rejection of Morton to "paranoia about America’s influence and power." In his "Digital Bridge" column, Politico writer Mark Scott pointed out that "her pre-emptive downfall had nothing to do with her qualifications" and that it is common for highly qualified economists to act as consultants for large firms. Scott quoted one EU official as saying "In the end, it came down to her passport. … I don’t see how this helps us implement the Digital Markets Act."

The Balanced Economy Project wrote that the Commission may have been so keen to insist on picking Morton because of her adherence to the doctrine of consumer welfare standard, which the Balanced Economy Project deem obsolete and ultimately anti-competition and pro-monopolies or pro-oligopolies.
