= Nancy Rose =

American economist

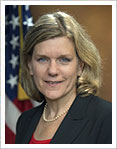
- Spouse: James M. Poterba

Academic background
- Education: Harvard University (BA); Massachusetts Institute of Technology (MA, PhD)
- Doctoral advisor: Paul Joskow; Franklin M. Fisher

Academic work
- Discipline: Industrial organization Regulatory economics
- Institutions: Massachusetts Institute of Technology
- Doctoral students: Fiona Scott Morton
- Awards: Carolyn Shaw Bell Award (2020); Fellow of the Econometric Society (2026)
- Website: Official website; Information at IDEAS / RePEc

Nancy Rose is an American economist, currently the Charles P. Kindleberger Professor and former head of the Department of Economics at Massachusetts Institute of Technology. From 2014 to 2016, Rose served as the deputy assistant attorney general for economic analysis in the Antitrust Division of the United States Department of Justice. Her research in the fields of industrial organization and the economics of regulation has covered a variety of industries, including airlines, electric utilities, and trucking.

== Selected works ==
- Borenstein, Severin, and Nancy L. Rose. "Competition and price dispersion in the US airline industry." Journal of Political Economy 102, no. 4 (1994): 653–683.
- Rose, Nancy L., and Andrea Shepard. Firm diversification and CEO compensation: Managerial ability or executive entrenchment?. No. w4723. National Bureau of Economic Research, 1994.
- Rose, Nancy L., and Paul L. Joskow. The diffusion of new technologies: evidence from the electric utility industry. No. w2676. National Bureau of Economic Research, 1988.
- Joskow, Paul L., and Nancy L. Rose. "The effects of economic regulation." Handbook of industrial organization 2 (1989): 1449–1506.
- Fabrizio, Kira R., Nancy L. Rose, and Catherine D. Wolfram. "Do markets reduce costs? Assessing the impact of regulatory restructuring on US electric generation efficiency." American Economic Review 97, no. 4 (2007): 1250–1277.
- Rose, Nancy L. "Labor rent sharing and regulation: Evidence from the trucking industry." Journal of Political Economy 95, no. 6 (1987): 1146–1178.
- Nancy L. Rose (August 29, 2014). Economic Regulation and Its Reform: What Have We Learned?. University of Chicago Press. ISBN 978-0226138022.
