= Digital Markets Act =

EU regulation on digital economy

Regulation (EU) 2022/1925
- European Union regulation
- Text with EEA relevance
- Title: Regulation on contestable and fair markets in the digital sector
- Made by: European Parliament and Council of the European Union
- Made under: Article 114 of the TFEU
- Journal reference: OJ L 265, 12.10.2022, p. 1–66

History
- European Parliament vote: 5 July 2022
- Council Vote: 18 July 2022
- Date made: 14 September 2022

Preparative texts
- Commission proposal: COM/2020/842 final

Other legislation
- Amends: Directive (EU) 2019/1937; Directive (EU) 2020/1828

The Digital Markets Act (DMA) (Note: Full title: Regulation (EU) 2022/1925 of the European Parliament and of the Council of 14 September 2022 on contestable and fair markets in the digital sector and amending Directives (EU) 2019/1937 and (EU) 2020/1828 (Digital Markets Act)) is an EU regulation that aims to make the digital economy fairer and more contestable. The regulation entered into force on 1 November 2022 and became applicable, for the most part, on 2 May 2023.

The DMA aims to ensure a higher degree of competition in European digital markets by preventing large companies from abusing their market power and by allowing new players to enter the market. This regulation targets the largest digital platforms operating in the European Union. They are also known as "gatekeepers" due to the "durable" market position in some digital sectors and because they also meet certain criteria related to the number of users, their turnovers, or capitalisation. Twenty-two services across six companies (deemed "gatekeepers") – Alphabet, Amazon, Apple, ByteDance, Meta, and Microsoft – were identified as "core platform services" by the EU in September 2023. These companies had until 6 March 2024 to comply with all of the Act's provisions.

The list of obligations includes prohibitions on combining data collected from two different services belonging to the same company (e.g., in the case of Meta, its social network Facebook and its communication platform WhatsApp); provisions for the protection of platforms' business users (including advertisers and publishers); legal instruments against the self-preferencing methods used by platforms for promoting their own products (e.g., preferential results for Google's products or services when using Google Search); provisions concerning the pre-installation of some services (e.g., Android); provisions related to bundling practices; and provisions for ensuring interoperability, portability, and access to data for businesses and end-users of platforms. There are also provisions to ensure the end user can remove any pre-installed software. Non-compliance may lead to sanctions, including fines of up to 10% of the worldwide turnover.

According to the European Commission, the main objective of this regulation is to regulate the behaviour of the so-called "Big Tech" firms within the European Single Market and beyond. The Commission aims to guarantee a fair level of competition ("level playing field") on the highly concentrated digital European markets, which are often characterised by a "winner takes all" configuration.

The DMA covers eight different sectors, which it refers to as Core Platforms Services (CPS). Due to the presence of gatekeepers who, to a certain degree, affect the market contestability, the CPS are considered problematic by the European Commission:

- online search engines (e.g. Google Search);
- online intermediation services (e.g. Google Play Store, Apple's App Store);
- social networks (e.g. Facebook);
- video sharing platforms (e.g. YouTube);
- communication platforms (e.g. WhatsApp, Gmail);
- advertising services (e.g. Google Ads);
- operating systems (e.g. Android, iOS);
- cloud services (e.g. Amazon Web Services).

In April 2024, Reuters reported on data from six companies which showed that in the first month after the regulations were implemented, independent browsers had seen a spike in users. The Cyprus-based Aloha Browser said users in the EU jumped 250% in March. Norway-based Vivaldi, Germany-based Ecosia and United States-based Brave have also seen user numbers rise following the new regulation.

== Background ==
=== EU Competition policy rules ===
The present rules applied within the European Union with regard to digital markets are derived from European and national legislation. Under these circumstances, the basis for competition rules in the EU is established by Articles 101 and 102 of the Treaty on the Functioning of the European Union (TFEU). Article 101 addresses anti-competitive agreements and concerted practices that may affect trade between members states or reduce competition in the common market. Article 102 aims to tackle the abuse of dominant positions. All players operating in the common market are therefore subject to these provisions. European and national authorities have identified the need to strengthen the current legislation, given the structural problems that are not covered.

=== Digital policy in the EU ===
The Digital Markets Act is in line with the legislative developments undertaken by the Juncker Commission between 2014 and 2019. One of the most important pieces of EU digital legislation is represented by the EU copyright rules. This has led to the protection, payment, and recognition of workers in thirty-three sectors and it aims to reward creativity, stimulate investment in the creative sector. Another relevant achievement can be considered the implementation of the General Data Protection Regulation (GDPR) in 2016. This regulation sets out the new European framework for the use and circulation of personal data and has a significant impact on the major digital players. In addition, the regulation on platform-to-business trading practices (P2B) has been established to create a fair, transparent and predictable business environment for smaller businesses and traders on online platforms. This regulation has applied in July 2020 and prevents market distortion, encourages healthy competition and prohibits unfair practices.

== Legislative procedure ==
The Digital Markets Act proposal was submitted by the European Commission to the European Parliament and to the Council of the European Union on 15 December 2020. Along with the Digital Services Act (DSA), the DMA is part of the commission's European Digital Strategy entitled Shaping Europe's Digital Future. The proposals were presented by the Executive Vice President of the European Commission for A Europe Fit for the Digital Age, Margrethe Vestager, and by the European Commissioner for Internal Market, Thierry Breton, as members of the Von der Leyen Commission.

On 23 November 2021, the Parliament's Committee on the Internal Market and Consumer Protection (IMCO) adopted its position on the DMA proposal, and the text was adopted in plenary session of the European Parliament on 15 December 2021. The approved text became the Parliament's mandate for negotiations with the council, which started under the French presidency of the Council in the first half of 2022. On 25 November 2021, the Council agreed its negotiating position, providing the Presidency with a mandate for the discussions.

On 24 March 2022, the Parliament and the Council meeting in the trilogue format together with the Commission reached a political agreement on the DMA. The negotiators reached a consensus on the interoperability provisions for large messaging platforms: the said obligations will make it possible for users to communicate between different platforms, giving them more choice against the increasing dominance of certain companies. The choice is expanded also through provisions that guarantee users' free choice as regards browsers, virtual assistants or search engines, while no interoperability obligation for social networks has been decided upon yet. In the political agreement, platforms with a market capitalization of €75 billion or turnover in the European Economic Area equal to or above €7.5 billion have been included in the rules' scope. An agreement was reached for penalties, which will be amounting from 10% of annual worldwide turnover due to non-compliance for first infringements up to 20% in the case of repeated infringements. The text of the DMA provisionally agreed in March 2022 was made publicly available by the European institutions only on 22 May 2022.

The DMA was formally adopted by the Parliament on 5 July 2022 and by the council on 19 July 2022, and it was signed into law on 14 September 2022 by Presidents of the Parliament and the Council, which concluded the legislative procedure. The adopted text was published in the Official Journal of the European Union on 12 October 2022, setting it to come into force twenty days after the publication, on 1 November 2022.

The 2 May 2023, 6 months later, the regulation started applying and the potential gatekeepers had 2 months to report to the commission to be identified as gatekeepers. This process would take up to 45 days and after being identified as gatekeepers, they would have 6 months to come into compliance, at the latest the 6 March 2024. From 7 March 2024, gatekeepers must comply with the DMA.

== Objective ==
The DMA specifically targets Big Tech companies. The DMA proposed to classify certain platforms, according to their number of users, capitalisation, market power or turnover, probably including Apple, Google, Facebook and Amazon as "Gatekeepers" making them subject to new obligations.

It aims at preventing large companies from abusing their market power and to allow smaller and new players to enter the market.

Critics have suggested that with six of the gatekeepers American and one Chinese, the DMA has been constructed to deliberately target US companies. The European Commission's technology and competition chiefs have responded that it is "not designed to target companies based on nationality".

=== Rationale ===
In December 2020, the European Commission released a legislative proposal that intends to protect consumer welfare and to restore a level playing field in the European Union's digital market. At the moment, the economy is being driven to a large extent by the activities conducted through online platforms. A small number of online platforms have come to play a crucial role in the lives of millions of individuals and companies. They intermediate a significant portion of transactions between consumers and businesses, leading to extreme dependencies of many businesses on these important platforms.

In the table below, it can be observed that EU digital markets face a high level of concentration, with companies such as Google or Facebook controlling almost the entirety of a specific market segment.

Sectors	Dominant company	Share of the EU market
Desktop OS	Microsoft Windows	78%
Web browsers	Google Chrome	60%
Search	Google Search	95%
Social media	Facebook	90%
E-commerce	Amazon	30% share of users and 60% in terms of market revenues
Travel/booking	Booking.com	35%
Video streaming	Netflix, Amazon Prime Video, HBO, Sky and DAZN	90% of the market revenues
Audio streaming	Spotify Apple Music and Amazon Music	55% 25%
Mobile OS (global market)	Google Android Apple iOS	72% 27%

The term gatekeeper refers to the ability of intermediary platforms to act as the main "bottleneck" to a large number of market participants, that are not reachable elsewhere. Behind this development are market forces that encompass (1) important economies of scale on the supply side; (2) strong direct and indirect network effects on the demand-side; (3) data-driven competitive advantage; (4) high rate of innovation; and (5) development of conglomerates that structure entire ecosystems. In addition, the combination of these elements can lead to market dynamics that follow the "winner-takes-most" scenarios.

During the last years, serious concerns have been expressed by authorities across the world with regard to the economic power of some digital giants. In Europe, the European Commission – backed by years of enforcement experience in EU competition law – has pointed out that a part of those intermediary platforms may be considered "Gatekeeper" or "structuring platforms" in their respective market segments. Moreover, it has also expressed the concern that Big Tech companies might unlawfully take advantage of their market and bargaining powers, in order to lock in dominant positions (i.e. in the existing markets), to increase their level of influence, and to obtain leading positions in new sectors of activity. Hence, this can be interpreted as providing unfair advantages to the incumbents present in core and ancillary services, as distorting the competition, and as harming the consumers, in the long run, through either increased prices or reduced options. Under EU competition law, reaching a "dominant position" is by no mean considered illegal, nor is the idea of a "winner takes most" scenario. However, practices that lock in dominant positions or that impose unfair conditions, terms to third parties might be treated as unlawful.

== The DMA rules ==
=== General framework ===
The Digital Markets Act sets up a list of conducts that should be outlawed, on the one hand, and obligations that platforms identified as gatekeepers should respect, on the other hand. The list is divided in two different parts, the general blacklisted actions (Article 5) and the case by case assessment that needs to be specified (Article 6).

=== Criteria defining Gatekeepers ===
The DMA combines quantitative and qualitative criteria in the process of designating gatekeepers. There are three criteria in the legislation:

- Criteria relating to the size of the companies: (a) a turnover of the company of at least 7.5 billion euro in the European Economic Area for three years at least or (b) a market capitalization or equivalent of at least 75 billion euro;
- Criteria relating to the place of the company in controlling access of other businesses to final customers: the company needs to have (a) more than 45 million monthly active end users in the EU and (b) more than 10,000 yearly active business in the EU;
- "An entrenched durable position" which is a qualitative criterion which the regulator considers met if the numbers of active users in the second criterion are met for three years in a row.

=== Sectors concerned (Core Platforms Services) ===
The DMA covers eight different sectors, also known as Core Platforms Services (CPS). The European Commission considers them problematic because the Gatekeepers' presence prevents market contestability to a certain extent. As of April 2025, the designated Gatekeepers and their services are:

Sector Gatekeeper	Ads	Browser	Intermediation	Communication (Note: The European Commission uses the term Number Independent Interpersonal Communications Services (NIICS, sometimes stylized NI-ICS) to refer to communications services that can operate without a "publicly assigned numbering resource"; an example of such a resource is a telephone number. NIICS include services such as Telegram, WhatsApp, Signal, iMessage, and the Messenger service provided by Facebook. Common communications services for NIICS include instant messaging (IM), including group-messaging, as well as calling services, including video-conferencing.)	Operating system	Search	Social network	Video sharing
Alphabet	Google	Chrome	Google Maps, Google Play, Google Shopping		Google Android	Google Search		YouTube
Amazon	Amazon		Amazon Marketplace					
Apple		Safari	App Store		iOS, iPadOS			
Booking.com			Booking.com					
ByteDance							TikTok	
Meta	Meta			WhatsApp, Messenger			Facebook, Instagram	
Microsoft					Windows PC OS		LinkedIn	

Apple's iPadOS was initially excluded from the list, as it does not meet the required quantitative thresholds. In April 2024, following an EU Commission market investigation, iPadOS has been deemed a gatekeeper core platform service for posing an "important gateway for business users to reach end users".

Other services that were under investigation include Microsoft's Bing, Edge and Microsoft Advertising; and Apple's iMessage.

On February 13, 2024, the European Commission announced their decision that Bing, Edge, Microsoft Advertising and iMessage don't qualify as gatekeeper services. The European Commission didn't go into detail on their decision other than stating that it was the result of "a thorough assessment of all arguments, taking into account input by relevant stakeholders, and after hearing the Digital Markets Advisory Committee." Despite the lack of detail provided by the European Commission on their decision, multiple outlets speculated that the decision was based on the services not meeting the threshold necessary to be classified as a gatekeeper service. This speculation was based, in part, on an article by the Financial Times from September 2023 that reported that both Microsoft and Apple made appeals on the grounds that there wasn't a big enough user base in Europe for the services under review. The Financial Times received this information from two sources with direct knowledge on the matter.

=== Obligations of gatekeepers ===
- It may prevent practices known as self-preferencing, applied by companies like Google for better displaying their products among the results of Google search.
- Gatekeeper companies could also be prohibited from reusing people's personal data. For example, Facebook could be forbidden from using the data obtained from its subsidiary WhatsApp.
- The proposal ensures rights to the platform's business users. For example, it could prohibit Apple from imposing a 30% commission on all the transactions concluded via App Store.
- Gatekeepers platforms may also be prohibited from requiring business users to offer their best deals on the platform (for example Amazon required e-book publishers to apply their best conditions on the Amazon e-book marketplace).
- There are also device neutrality rules regarding the rights to delete pre-installed applications (as in the case of Apple iOS or Google Android for example) and to install apps from other sources.
- Protection rights for business users of platforms (including advertisers and publishers).
- Prohibition of some bundling practices.
- Provisions for ensuring a higher degree of data portability, interoperability, and access to data for the platform's business and end-users.
- Companies that do not comply with the new obligations may risk fines up to 10% on their worldwide turnover.

The two following sections detail each rule individually and mention, when it is the case, the concrete example that determined the commission to include them.

==== Forbidden actions ====
This list comprises seven obligations and prohibitions for addressing the unfair trading practices. All the identified gatekeepers will have to respect these provisions:

(a) Prevents Gatekeepers to combine personal data coming from Core Platforms Services (CPS) with data collected through other services of the same Gatekeepers or from a third party. Also, it prevents end-users being signed-in to other services offered by the Gatekeepers. However, this can be done only if the choice has been presented to the end-user and consent given.

Combining personal data from different sources was ruled illegal by the German Federal Cartel Office in 2019, in a case against Facebook. The company was also fined €110 million in May 2017 for notifying the Commission that it would not be possible to combine data coming from Facebook and WhatsApp, at the time of the acquisition of WhatsApp in 2014. However, the Commission found that this practice constituted a possibility since 2014, given the fact that WhatsApp inserted this option in its terms of services privacy policy in 2016.

(b) allow business users to offer the same products or services to end-users through third party online intermediation services at prices or conditions that are different from those offered through the online intermediation services of the Gatekeeper.

This has already been considered illegal in a competition law-case concerning Amazon e-books. In its contracts with the publishers of E-books, Amazon required them to offer at least the best price or conditions that they proposed to any other competitors. This article also derives from the cases concerning online travel agencies such as Booking.com or Expedia.

(c) allow business users to promote offers to end users acquired via the core platform service, and to conclude contracts with these end users regardless of whether for that purpose they use the core platform services of the gatekeeper or not, allow end users to access and use, through the core platform services of the gatekeeper, content, subscriptions, features or other items by using the software application of a business user, where these items have been acquired by the end users from the relevant business user without using the core platform services of the gatekeeper

The legal character of this kind of practices is currently investigated by the European Commission in a case concerning the App Store of Apple and the 30% commission that they charged to all the subscriptions made through the App Store.

(d) refrain from preventing or restricting business users from raising issues with any relevant public authority relating to any practice of gatekeepers

This is a general practice that does not come from the case law but it guarantees the right of business-users to raise possible concerns to public authorities (such as the European Commission).

(e) refrain from requiring business users to use, offer or interoperate with an identification service of the gatekeeper in the context of services offered by the business users using the core platform services of that gatekeeper.

Also known as a bundling practice, it prevents gatekeepers from forcing business users to use the ID of the Core Platform Services when they offer their services. Thus, it is often related to advertisers or publishers issues such as Google and their methods of collecting data.

(f) Prevents the bundling of different CPSs of the platform that are identified as gatekeeper.

For this bundling practice, in 2018, Google was fined with €4.3 billion by the Commission in a decision on Android. The company breached the antitrust rules of the EU by forcing Android's users to pre-install its own services, such as Google search and Google Chrome. This way, Google secured its dominant position in terms of internet search.

(g) provide advertisers and publishers to which it supplies advertising services, upon their request, with information concerning the price paid by the advertiser and publisher, as well as the amount or remuneration paid to the publisher, for the publishing of a given ad and for each of the relevant advertising services provided by the gatekeeper

This last obligation is linked to the investigation of the European Commission on Google's data and advertising practices.

==== Case by case assessment ====
Article 6 of the DMA contains a second list of eleven obligations and prohibitions for gatekeepers. These obligations are specified individually by the European Commission after consulting the gatekeepers concerned.

(a) refrain from using, in competition with business users, any data not publicly available, which is generated through activities by those business users, including by the end users of these business users, of its core platform services or provided by those business users of its core platform services or by the end users of these business users

The potential ban of this practice derives from the Amazon Marketplace case that is under investigation by the European Commission. The Commission claimed that Amazon breached antitrust rules by using "non-public data" from their business users in order to compete with them.

(b) To guarantee the possibility for end-users to uninstall pre-installed applications on its CPS.

This obligation derives from the cases on Microsoft Internet Explorer and Google Android, where the European Commission forced them to allow end-users to uninstall pre-installed app from their core platforms services.

(c) allow the installation and effective use of third party software applications or software application stores using, or interoperating with, operating systems of that gatekeeper and allow these software applications or software application stores to be accessed by means other than the core platform services of that gatekeeper

The practice is currently investigated in the Apple App Store case. The Commission considers that Apple does not let its competitors inform users about the possibility to buy their products on other platforms than the App store, at potential cheaper prices.

(d) refrain from treating more favourably in ranking services and products offered by the gatekeeper itself or by any third party belonging to the same undertaking compared to similar services or products of third party and apply fair and non discriminatory conditions to such ranking

This practice has already been prohibited in the case of Google Shopping and is currently investigated in the Amazon Buy Box case. Mainly, it refers to self-preferencing own products at the expense of competitors in the search results of a certain marketplace.

(e) refrain from technically restricting the ability of end users to switch between and subscribe to different software applications and services to be accessed using the operating system of the gatekeeper...

This can be seen as deriving from the conflict between Spotify and Apple on the restrictions imposed to use Spotify on Apple devices, that had the purpose of promoting Apple music services.

(f) allow business users and providers of ancillary services access to and interoperability with the same operating system, hardware or software features that are available or used in the provision by the gatekeeper of any ancillary services

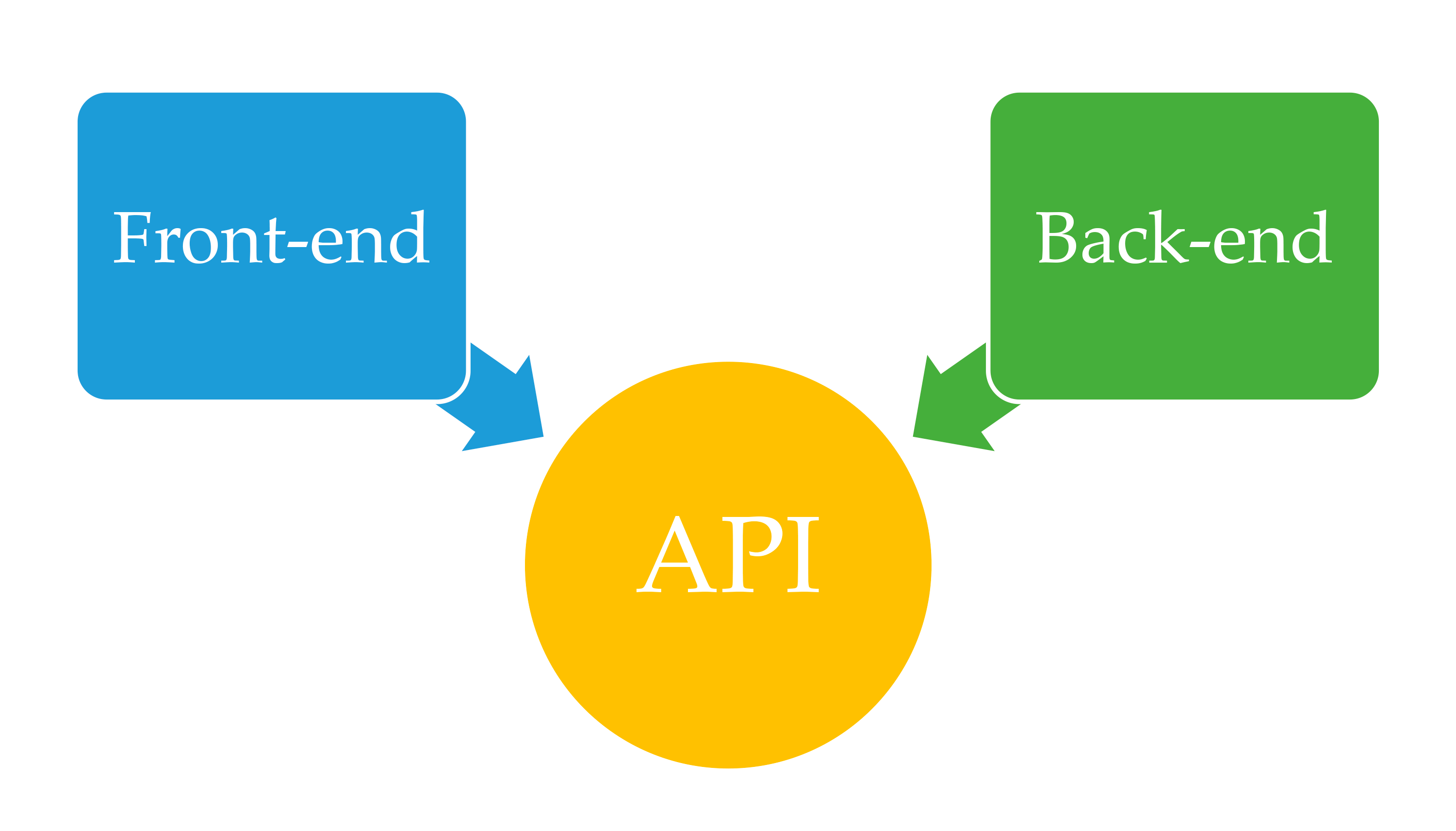
Interoperability: Application programming interface (API) allow to connect providers of ancillary services to the operating system, hardware or software of gatekeepers, they can enable interoperability as required by the DMA

This provision can be illustrated for example by practices currently analysed in the Apple Pay case. By favouring its devices and its own method of payment – Apple Pay – at the expense of its competitors, Apple is currently scrutinized by the commission. Interoperability requirement is a key demand by civil society and the open source community.

(g) provide advertisers and publishers, upon their request and free of charge, with access to the performance measuring tools of the gatekeeper and the information necessary for advertisers and publishers to carry out their own independent verification of the ad inventory

This article would help business users of platforms, especially advertisers, to have access to the data related to the ads and publications posted on the Gatekeeper's platforms. Facebook and Google are potentially the main targets of this article, and maybe Amazon.

(h) provide effective portability of data generated through the activity of a business user or end user and shall, in particular, provide tools for end users to facilitate the exercise of data portability, in line with GDPR (Regulation EU 2016/679), including by the provision of continuous and real-time access

The abovementioned provision has a more general scope and it is not built around specific cases. Seen as complementing the GDPR regulation, it gives more precision regarding the scope of data portability, by adding that the data access should be "continuous" and "real time". In practical terms, this guarantees both access to users (including business-users) and benefits in terms of up-to-date data portability generated by the platform.

(i) provide business users, or third parties authorised by a business user, free of charge, with effective, high-quality, continuous and real-time access and use of aggregated or non-aggregated data, that is provided for or generated in the context of the use of the relevant core platform services by those business users and the end users engaging with the products or services provided by those business users; for personal data, provide access and use only where directly connected with the use effectuated by the end user in respect of the products or services offered by the relevant business user through the relevant core platform service, and when the end user opts in to such sharing with a consent in the sense of the GDPR Regulation (EU) 2016/679;

As article (h), this article does not derive from an individual case and complements the GDPR. It guarantees more rights to business and end-users regarding the interoperability of the data generated on platforms. This is meant to make data generated by different platforms compatible and usable by different systems.

(j) provide to any third party providers of online search engines, upon their request, with access on fair, reasonable and non-discriminatory terms to ranking, query, click and view data in relation to free and paid search generated by end users on online search engines of the gatekeeper, subject to anonymisation for the query, click and view data that constitutes personal data;

This article is especially meant to ensure a higher degree of competition in the online search engines market, by providing more rights to the (new) competitors. It gives providers of online search engines access to data generated by the Gatekeeper in the sector (presumably Google Search at the moment, as it concentrates 95% of the market share in this sector). This is also related to the Google Search case and to Article 5(d) or the "blacklisted actions" of the DMA (see above).

(k) apply fair and non-discriminatory general conditions of access for business users to its software application store ...

This provision targets the store application of Gatekeepers (App Store, Google Play), and has the aim to protect the rights of app developers and of business-users.

=== Other obligations for gatekeepers ===
- Under Art. 12, Gatekeepers have to notify the Commission their intended future merger and acquisition.
- Under Art. 3, Gatekeepers have to notify the Commission when they meet the thresholds to be considered as gatekeepers (see above the section related to the criteria).
- Under Art. 13, when designated as gatekeepers, the firm has to conduct an independent audit about their profiling technique of consumers and submit it to the commission.

=== European Commission's investigation powers and sanctions mechanisms ===
The Digital Markets Act will allow the European Commission to have regulatory and market investigation powers. Under these circumstances, market investigations will be mainly designated to:

- Conduct markets investigation so as to specify the obligations imposed on Gatekeepers and monitor compliance (Art. 16)
- Conduct markets investigation in order to designate gatekeepers (Art. 15)
- Conduct market investigations to identify new services and practices that can be subject to the obligations listed in Art. 5 and Art. 6 (Art. 17)
- Chapter V of the proposal gives the commission a certain number of rights in order to conduct these investigations
- Sanctions for gatekeepers in case of non-compliance or systematic non-compliance are represented by fines up to 10% of the Gatekeeper's worldwide turnover.

=== Relationship to national competition law enforcement ===
Art. 1(5) of the Digital Markets Act states that Member States are prohibited from imposing on gatekeepers further obligations by way of laws, regulations or administrative action for the purpose of ensuring contestable and fair markets. Obligations that are unrelated to the relevant undertakings having a status of gatekeeper within the meaning of the Digital Markets Act are exempted from this prohibition.

On 22 March 2022, the European Court of Justice ruled in the joint cases C-117/20 Bpost and C-151/20 Nordzucker that investigators can start antitrust scrutiny of companies that have already been probed under sector regulation such as the Digital Markets Act, so long as the two cases are "conducted in a sufficiently coordinated manner within a proximate timeframe and the overall penalties imposed must correspond to the seriousness of the offenses committed."

This opens up a path for parallel national prosecution of gatekeepers, for example as Germany has done under the German competition law amendment Section 19a. The German Federal Cartel Office has in 2021 opened multiple proceedings against large tech firms that would be considered gatekeepers under the Digital Markets Act, including Facebook (now: Meta), Amazon, Apple and Google. Section 19a cases may involve coordination among the German Federal Cartel Office and the European Commission and other national competition authorities. Legally, it has been proposed by the Federal Cartel Office that Section 19a must be seen as an expansion of competition law, meaning that it could be applied parallel to the Digital Markets Act. The trilogue negotiations on the Digital Markets Act have not yielded a common position on the matter.

== Designated gatekeepers ==
In September 2023, the European Commission designated six firms as gatekeepers under the DMA: Alphabet, Amazon, Apple, ByteDance, Meta and Microsoft. Booking, the owner of Booking.com, was additionally designated a gatekeeper in May 2024.

Twenty-three services from seven gatekeepers are designated core platform services as of April 2025.

- Alphabet: Google Search, Google Maps, Google Play, Google Shopping, Google Ads, Chrome, Android, YouTube
- Amazon: Amazon Marketplace, Amazon Product Advertising
- Apple: App Store, Safari, iOS, iPadOS
- Booking: Booking.com
- Bytedance: TikTok
- Meta: Facebook, Instagram, WhatsApp, Messenger
- Microsoft: LinkedIn, Microsoft Windows

=== Alphabet ===
Alphabet Inc. is the parent company of Google. Tensions between Alphabet and the European Union have been generated by sanctions applied to unfair practices related to advertising, mobile operating system, or shopping strategies. Several fines were imposed by the European Commission to Alphabet because of breaches of competition law but taking into account that despite the CJEU's rulings, "inefficient market outcomes in terms of higher prices, lower quality, less choice and innovation" still emerged, the DMA aims to better regulate this area.

As the main focus of the DMA is represented by operators that provide search engines, social networks, cloud computing services and operating systems, Google was one of the companies that officially presented its position. In an interview, Google executive Matt Brittin stated that: "It's so important to get the rules right for European consumers to have more choice, to support the kind of jobs we'll need in the future and to support European businesses."

Even though not specifically named, Google is one of the companies that will be affected by the stringent rules, because the legislation will be applied to firms with European revenues of at least €6.5 bn or at least 45 million users across Europe. Nevertheless, as subject to potential fines of up to 10% of its global revenue for breaking the rules, Google is highly incentivized to continue influencing the legislators and lobbying in Brussels for obtaining better conditions under the Digital Market Act.

The rhetoric of Google and its attempts to contour an official position relied mainly on the risks that might emerge from the legislative act, namely barriers – "as Europeans will only have access to less choice and to more costly alternatives". Nevertheless, the big tech has also tried to highlight the weaknesses of the Digital Market Act and they labelled it a blacklist – whose implications in terms of interoperability might not generate innovation in the future, but incentives for "lowest common denominator".

In November 2020, the French news magazine Le Point published Google's leaked lobby strategy on the Digital Market Act, thus several practices and intentions have been uncovered. For example, there were made references to:

- Lobby at Parliament, Commission and member state level;
- Re-frame the political narrative around costs to the economy and consumers;
- Mobilise third parties (such as think-tanks and academics) to echo Google's message;
- Mobilise the US Government;
- Create "pushback" against Commissioner Breton (who was seen as supporting potential break ups)
- Create conflict between Commission departments.

As far as the cost of these lobbying practices is concerned, according to the Transparency Register, Google spent more than €19 million on lobbying in the first half of 2020. Even though the sum of money allocated by Google has already reached significant levels, the numbers presented above do not comprise all the transactions related to academic partnerships, law firms, or activities conducted in individual Member States.

Corporate Europe Observatory investigated the fight of EU tech regulation and according to its findings, 158 meetings were registered since the Von der Leyen Commission took office, meetings that "involved 103 organisations, mostly companies and lobby groups. Only 13 actors had at least 3 or more meetings logged on these issues. Google stands out with the most meetings with Microsoft and Facebook trailing close behind. Apple and Amazon have also lobbied on the DMA and/ or DSA, although they rank lower overall with two and one meeting respectively". However, one of the limitations faced is represented by the fact that the endeavours with the officials responsible for drafting the legislation are not mentioned, as only the official meetings with high representatives are declared or announced.

Despite the fact that the proposal has been published on 15 December 2020, the lobbying practices still represent an ongoing process because they have been transferred from the commission to the European Parliament and Council. However, comparing the data obtained on the meetings of the European Commission with the information made available by the other institutions, it can be observed that transparency is even less stringent.

In October 2023 the German cartel office said Alphabet unit Google had agreed to change its user data practices to end a German antitrust investigation aimed at curbing its data-driven market power.

Alphabet responded by:

- Creating the Data Portability API, an API that allows to transfer content of Chrome browser, Google Maps, Play Store, Google Search, Google Shopping, and YouTube to another service, but is only available in all EEA countries only, and the United Kingdom
- Added additional data for EEA advertisers.
- Launching a program to have external payment in Google Play Store.
- Android 14 supports seamless updating on third-party app stores worldwide.
- Added a settings panel to unlink data between most Google services.
- Added EU choice screens to Android, which are randomly ordered.
- Added dedicated chips to link to external services for features like flight search.

In September 2024, the EU Court of Justice found that Google's shopping search was in violation of the Digital Markets Act.

=== Amazon ===
Amazon welcomed the DMA and according to its position, the company has not been as concerned about it as the other GAFAM members. This can be explained by the fact that compared to Google's and Apple's case, the Digital Markets Act could affect Amazon only in three aspects:

- Amazon might be obliged to allow business users to offer the same products or services to end-users at prices or conditions that are different from those offered by Amazon (DMA Article 5b)
- Amazon might be obliged not to use data from competitors that is not public (DMA Article 6a)
- Amazon might be obliged not to treat the services and the products it offers more favourably (DMA Article 6d)

The prohibition on using non-public data from competitors it hosts on its platform and the prohibition on ranking its product before the ones offered by competitors may impact Amazon if the proposal for the DMA is adopted under its current form. Moreover, these aspects caused Amazon to negotiate the final version of the regulation, taking into account that it spent €1.75 million on lobbying practices and that it became a member of several think tanks.

=== Apple ===
The new European draft legislation has also targeted Apple's App Store with regard to its practices and preinstalled applications. One of the main changes that will be brought to their current business model is represented by the removal of the "self-preferencing" strategy. As a result of the proposal on the Digital Markets Act, Apple would be forced to change the manner in which its apps are displayed in the App Store searches, so as to give the chance to smaller developers to have their software downloaded by consumers. Moreover, Apple will have to allow its customers to uninstall preloaded first-party apps from the devices procured. Thus, both Google and Apple will be constrained and their practices more regulated. According to the DMA final proposal, these big tech companies will be compelled to share performance metrics for free with advertisers and publishers.

Before the official release of the DMA proposal, some companies – including Apple – tried to change their behaviour, taking into account the reactions generated by the commission's intent to regulate the digital market. As far as Apple is concerned, in October, a group of French publishers – led by Alliance de la Presse d'Information Générale (APIG) – highlighted its concern with regard to the App Store's terms of service. For example, one of their requirements was related to the economic dependence on Apple – "Content publishers are in a situation of absolute economic dependence on Apple for the distribution of their content on the iPhone, since the only store available on this device is the AppStore". In addition, Apple was criticised for the 30% commission on sales that it makes through apps on the platform, thus the APIG showed its concern vis a vis the further concentration on the market. The reaction of Apple to these allegations was focused especially on a reduction of its commission rate to 15% for app developers with less than $1 million in annual net sales, but this did not impede the European Commission to continue advocating for the Digital Markets Act.

Similar to Google's case, Apple also seeks to limit the influence of the commission and to escape the definition of gatekeeper, so as not to become subject to further obligations. However, as Brussels still wants to outlaw gatekeepers' ability to ban others from accessing their marketplaces, firms like Spotify and Facebook – that believe Apple has set unfair conditions on those companies' apps within App Store, seem to support the commission's proposal.

The strategy of Apple to limit the influence of the DMA is not as clear or well-structured as in Google's case. However, there can be observed some practices engaged in by the company to ensure that its objectives are taken into account by the European officials. According to a research conducted by the Corporate Europe Observatory, it seems that Apple, Google, and Facebook used to work with several associations that declared themselves independent, without disclosing their linkages. For example, the Center for European Reform has featured on its website a list of its corporate donors – one of them being Apple – but Apple does not specify this information on the Transparency Register entry. Under these circumstances, it can be observed the network created around interests' groups, companies, NGOs and think tanks, as all of them seek to shape the legislative process in Brussels in their favour.

When it comes to lobby spending, despite the limited and incomplete information, it can be observed that Apple is in the top 30 individual corporate lobby spenders in Brussels, at numbers 16 (with over €2 million). In comparison with Google, that has allocated a budget of €8 million, Apple still invests a considerable sum of money on access to European officials, so as to present its demands.

On June 24, 2024, Apple became the first company to be charged under the DMA, with regulators alleging that the company's Apple Store policies are illegal.

=== ByteDance ===
ByteDance is the one non-American company on the list of Gatekeepers. Its major service offering is the video hosting social network TikTok.

ByteDance responded by launching a Data Portability API for EEA users, later to provide "increased access" to the API, improving the Download Your Data tool's speed and adding the ability to partially export TikTok data by allowing selections of categories to export. A webform for future DMA compliance was created.

=== Meta ===
Considering that the Digital Markets Act aims to limit the influence of large companies by allowing alternative players to emerge, Meta has also been targeted by the legislative proposal. As in the other companies' cases, once the DMA is adopted, unfair practices will be highly discouraged and even prohibited, so as to stop the harm they bring to competition.

However, apart from Google, Apple, and Amazon, Meta seems to support the EU rules that have been published last year. In its official declarations, Meta claimed that it hopes that the European Union will set boundaries for Apple. Nevertheless, in this context there were not observed solely tensions between the Commission and the Big Tech companies, but even between GAFAM, taking into account their statements and the objectives they advocate for.

The controversies between Meta and Apple started with the privacy feature used by Apple, that allows consumers to block advertisers from tracking them across different applications. Thus, Meta, a company that earns revenue from advertising, began to retaliate and showed its discontent. It has also added that "Apple controls an entire ecosystem from device to app store and apps, and uses this power to harm developers and consumers, as well as large platforms like Facebook". The reaction of Apple was quite harsh and accused Meta of "invasive tracking". Therefore, the discussions around the Digital Markets Act started to create more tensions between Big Tech firms and to deviate from the scope of the proposal, as the companies focused on criticising their "competitors" of illegal practices.

=== Microsoft ===
Microsoft was identified as gatekeeper. The consultant Cristina Caffarra and professor Fiona Scott Morton presented the view that the only obligation that might affect Microsoft under the DMA was to enable end-users to delete any software applications pre-installed. It is unclear whether Scott Morton was consulting already for Microsoft at the time of making such statements, her consulting work for Microsoft became known during the Fiona Scott Morton affair.

Microsoft complied by allowing worldwide users to uninstall Camera, Photos, and Cortana, and EEA users to uninstall Bing Web Search and Microsoft Edge. APIs for custom search engines and widget feeds were created for EEA exclusive users. EEA users will also be prompted about syncing a PC's data to Microsoft. A registry hack was shortly created to get these changes without living in an EEA country or having to move to an EEA country. EEA users are no longer advertised about Microsoft Edge.

== Non-Gatekeeper firms ==
=== Airbnb and Booking.com ===
Due to their important positions on the short-term accommodation market, Airbnb and Booking.com became potential targets for the legislation. Indeed, above 50% of the homes designated for 'short-terms stay' are listed on AirBnB, and approximatively 30% on Booking.com. Therefore, their possible labelling as gatekeepers has been long debated, leading the companies to defend themselves and explain why they should not be considered included in this category. Moreover, Booking.com insisted on the fact that it is one of the only European companies that is a global success and that as they are not the most dominant actor in this sector, they should not be disincentivized while competing with bigger companies.

=== Spotify ===
With approximately one third of the market share in the music subscription market in 2020, Spotify is by far the dominant actor in this sector, with Apple Music coming in second position, with around 15% of market share. However, Spotify does not seem to meet the criteria set by the European Commission, according to the analysis of Vox EU. Dirk Auer, an economist of the American think tank ICLE, qualified this piece of legislation as a way to protect the European firms, and that the criteria are on purpose excluding major European tech firms, notably Spotify. Even if it is true that SAP would probably be the only European firm targeted by the legal act, there are also American big platforms like Twitter or Uber not targeted by the legislation, despite their important market position.

=== Samsung ===
Although Samsung had appeared earlier on a list of possible gatekeepers, it was not on the final list.

=== X (Twitter) ===
In October 2024, the European Commission decided that X (formerly known as Twitter) is not considered a gatekeeper in online social networking, as it is "not an important gateway for business users to reach end users."

== Reaction within the European Union ==
=== France ===
The French Government expressed its ambition for imposing stricter enforcement on competition rules, so as to prevent giant tech firms favouring their own services, ousting rivals or maintaining their dominant positions.

Nevertheless, France would like to rely on the possibility of adapting the rules, through the Digital Markets Act, in order to respond to the constant changes of the digital market.

The French government is known to be publicly in favour of more regulation of the GAFAM and unilaterally set up its "GAFA tax" in 2019. This tax was the source of tensions with the Trump administration.

=== Germany ===
The German federal government welcomed the proposal on the Digital Markets Act. They consider that the current European legal framework is not sufficiently strong and that the enforcement measures must also be strengthened with respect to digital platforms. However, the main concern of Germany still remains the preservation of small and medium-sized companies, as it intends to keep them out of the scope of the new rules.

The head of the German Federal Cartel Office, Andreas Mundt, has on several occasions criticised the European Commission's centralised approach to regulating gatekeepers. He has called the European Commission's veto right over national competition authorities' powers to impose decisions against Big Tech "unacceptable", and has asked for more powers to be given to national competition authorities. This position was echoed by other Member States.

=== Netherlands ===
In October 2020, the Dutch Government jointly with France and Belgium, expressed their willingness for a stricter enforcement of the competition rules, in order to avoid abuse of dominance and anti-competitive practices.

On 17 February 2021, the Dutch Government published its official position on the Digital Markets Act and welcomed the initiative, taking into account that the objectives it comprises are aligned with their national position.

=== Ireland ===
The Irish government published its position on 8 September 2020, during the public consultations held for the Digital Services Act Package. According to their statements, Irish authorities are not willing to assess the definition of "gatekeepers", as they explained that the occupation of a dominant position is not illegal. Moreover, they have also stressed that this particular aspect does not imply a diminution of consumer welfare and does not prevent innovation or new entrances in the digital market.

Many of the companies that are likely to be targeted by the DMA have their headquarters in Ireland. The approach of the Irish Government towards Big Tech companies has often been the source of debates within the European Union. In 2016, the European Commission accused Ireland of granting Apple "illegal tax benefits". The General Court ruled in favour of Apple, but the Commission expressed its intention to appeal the ruling to the European Court of Justice.

== Rest of the world's position ==
As with other pieces of complex legislation (the 'Brussels effect'), other countries have taken steps to copy the DMA.

=== Brazil ===
Draft legislation has been launched to implement a regulatory framework inspired by the European Union's Digital Markets Act.

=== India ===
The Indian government is considering a DMA-styled regulatory approach to apply to "systemically important digital intermediaries. However, as of April 2024 no concrete proposals were done.

=== Japan ===
Japan is reworking its competition laws and regulations in order to more close resemble the regulatory structure of the European Union.

=== South Korea ===
The "Promotion of Platform competition" is modeled on the DMA, but is currently delayed.

=== United Kingdom ===
The Digital Markets, Competition and Consumers Act 2024, granting powers to the Competition and Markets Authority to regulate technology companies with strategic market power, has been passed by Parliament and was granted royal assent to become law on 24 May 2024.

== Relations with the United States ==
The DMA has been a recurring source of friction between the EU and the United States. After Donald Trump returned to office in 2025, his administration objected to the EU's digital rules and argued that they fell mainly on American companies. In February 2025, US officials asked the EU's antitrust chief to clarify how the rules would be applied. EU technology and competition officials replied that the regulation does not target companies by nationality.

The dispute continued through the following year. The US administration sought changes to the EU rules and threatened tariffs. In late 2025 the State Department imposed visa restrictions on several EU officials and NGO figures it accused of pressing online platforms to restrict the speech of American users. The Commission said it would keep enforcing the DMA and the Digital Services Act in 2026 while preparing separate legislation to simplify parts of both.

== Violations and fines ==
In April 2025, Apple and Meta became the first companies to be penalized for violating the Digital Markets Act. Apple was fined 500 million euros ($570 million) and Meta was fined 200 million euros ($230 million) respectively.

In July 2026, Google received two fines of €460 million and €430 million under the Digital Markets Act, for preferencing its own services in search results, and for Play Store rules blocking app developers from showing cheaper offers on non-Google marketplaces.

== See also ==
- Digital Services Act
- European Economic Area
- EU–US Privacy Shield
- European Data Protection Supervisor
- Data Act (European Union)
- Data Governance Act
- Cyber Security and Resilience Bill
