= Stefano Quintarelli =

Italian politician and IT specialist

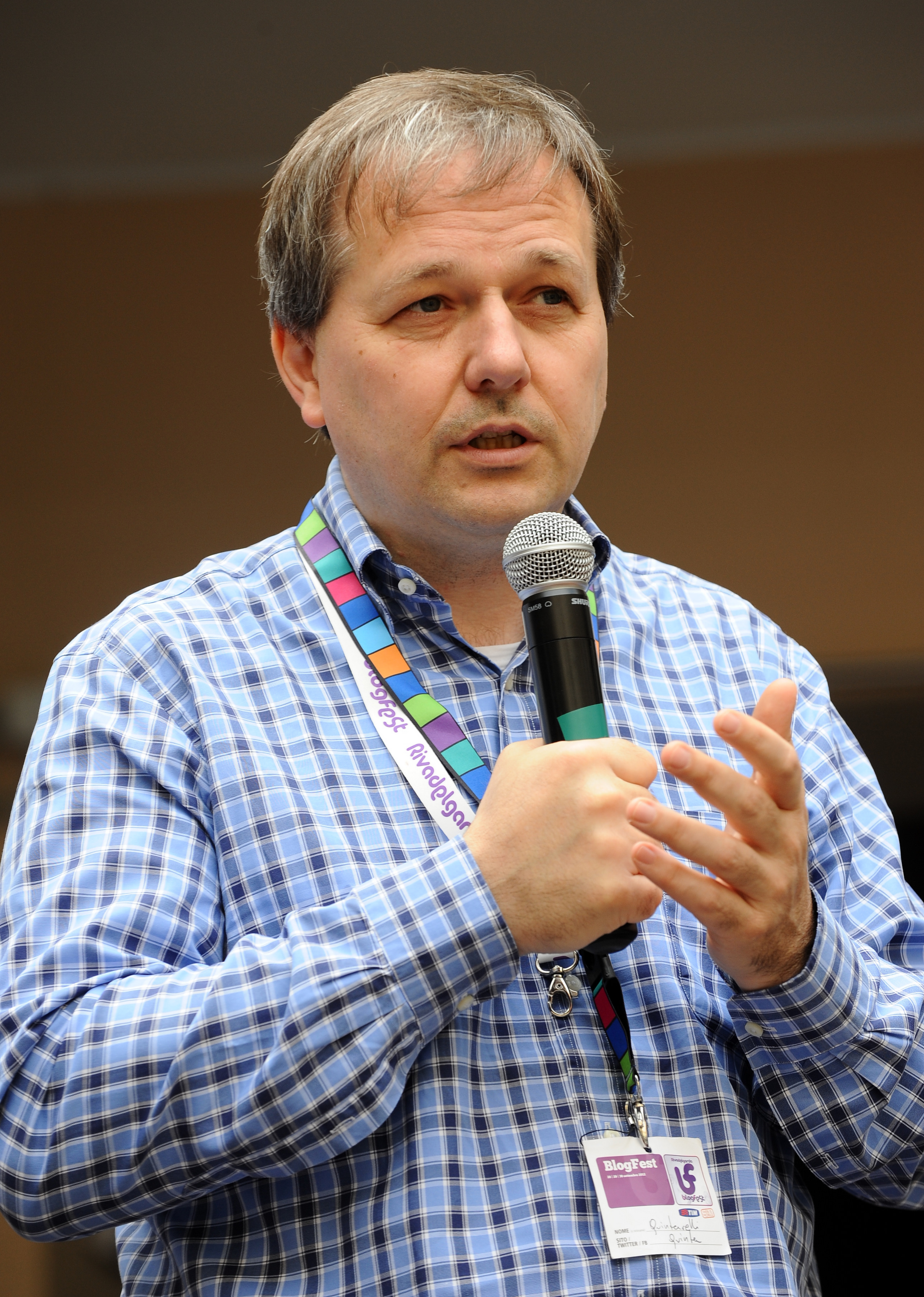
Stefano Quintarelli, 2012

Stefano Quintarelli (born 14 June 1965) is an Italian information technology specialist and a descendant of the Italian writer Emilio Salgari. He was a member of the Italian Parliament in the XVII legislature, as part of the Civics and Innovators group.

He was a member of the telecommunications and transport commission in the Italian Parliament during the XVII Legislature and is President of AGID (Government Agency for Digital Italy).

Quintarelli was included in a Corriere della Sera article on the thirty most innovative Italian entrepreneurs.

After leaving BT Group in 2007, until July 2012 he was the managing director of the digital area of Il Sole 24 Ore, an Italian financial newspaper. He left office when he was proposed as an independent candidate for the presidency of AGCOM, the Italian communications authority. In proposing his candidacy, the Italian section of ISOC likened him to one of the great figures of the Renaissance.

In 2015, he formally defined the concept of Device Neutrality and proposed a bill to enforce it in Italy. The bill was stopped at the final vote in the Senate in 2017, after many successful votes in the Chamber of Deputies and through all Senate committees, due to lobbying efforts by some multinational device manufacturers and telecom operators. The law has since gained formal support at the European Commission by BEUC, the European Consumer Organisation, the Electronic Frontier Foundation, and the Hermes Center for Transparency and Digital Human Rights. A law with identical principles has been passed in South Korea, and the French telecoms regulator ARCEP has called for the introduction of Device Neutrality in Europe. He defined the foundational principles of European Union Digital Identity under the eIDAS regulation.

He theorized the Internet as a dimension of existence, in which social and economic relations are created and developed, and the emergence of a new class conflict between intermediaries and the intermediated that surrounds and dominates the traditional conflict between capitalists and the proletariat. This introduces, in addition to the traditional categories of capital and labor, the information category, which is controlled by a small number of info-plutocrats.

From 2014 to 2021, he was the chairman of AgID, Italy's digital agency.
