= Inflationary psychology =

Inflationary psychology is a sociological and economic phenomenon that occurs during times of Inflation.
