= Assist-2-Sell =

Assist-2-Sell, Inc.
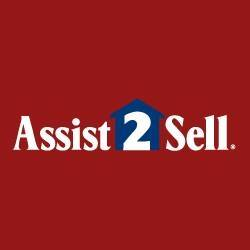
- Assist-2-Sell's logo
- Company type: Privately held company
- Industry: Real estate Franchising
- Founded: 1987 in Reno, Nevada
- Founders: Mary LaMeres-Pomin; Lyle Martin
- Headquarters: 1610 Meadow Wood Lane, Reno, Nevada, U.S.
- Key people: Mary LaMeres-Pomin (CEO)
- Website: www.assist2sell.com

Assist-2-Sell is an American real estate franchise organization operating in the United States and Canada. It was founded in 1987 by Mary LaMeres-Pomin and Lyle E. Martin and is based in Reno, Nevada.

== History ==
Assist-2-Sell was founded in 1987 by Mary LaMeres-Pomin and Lyle E. Martin, who had been conventional real estate agents for 10 years prior to founding Assist-2-Sell. They did not want to spend a significant portion of their time looking for clients so created a discount real estate firm in the hopes that with lower prices, clients would directly come to Assist-2-Sell. Assist-2-Sell is founded in and based in Reno.

According to The Commercial Appeal, Assist-2-Sell "falls between using a traditional real estate firm and selling your home yourself". The Portland Press Herald said in 2000, "Word of Assist-2-Sell's rates and reputation has gotten around the realty circle with reaction ranging from skepticism to intimidation."

Reno Gazette-Journal in 2002 called Assist-2-Sell "[o]ne of North America's largest residential discount realty companies". In 2006, it had 630 offices in Canada and 46 American states.

Its main competitor is the company Help-U-Sell. Newsweek said Help-U-Sell and Assist-2-Sell are "the two largest flat-fee brokerages" that in 2004 had a combined almost 900 offices.

== Services and franchise program ==
Assist-2-Sell has two advertising options for clients to choose from. In the first option, "Direct to Buyer", the real estate agent acts like a conventional agent by marketing the property and dealing with the documents. In the second option, "MLS for Less", sellers get all of the benefits from the previous method as well as having their house listed on the MLS. It advertises houses through newspapers, magazines, mail, and signs, as well as the iHouse2000.com website. The company receives a commission only after a house is sold.

Assist-2-Sell started its franchise program in 1995. Every franchisee is managed and held independently. Assist-2-Sell provides coaching for its franchisees by teaching them how to establish and operate a back office, how to hire real estate agents, how to draw in customers, and how to display houses. In 2004, Assist-2-Sell charged franchisees $19,500 in addition to a 5% cut of each sold home.
