= IDrive Inc. =

American data backup company

- Industry: Online Backup Software
- Predecessor: Pro Softnet Corporation
- Founded: 1995; 31 years ago
- Headquarters: Calabasas, California, U.S.
- Products: IDrive
- Website: www.idrive.com

IDrive Inc. is a technology company that specializes in data backup applications. Its flagship product is IDrive, an online backup service available to Windows, Mac, Linux, iOS (iPhone and iPad) and Android users.

== Overview ==
Pro Softnet Corporation was founded in 1995 and is based in Calabasas, California, within Los Angeles County.

Pro Softnet Corporation's initial product was called IBackup, but it acquired the idrive.com domain name from defunct company I-drive around mid-2003.

IDrive products were mentioned by Lifehacker, Macworld, PC World, CNET, Tech Crunch, Notebook Review, PC Magazine and Engadget.

Pro Softnet Corporation has been plagued by patent infringement lawsuits and has spoken out publicly about how they are a drain on the company's resources.

== Products ==
IDrive is an automated backup application that runs on Windows, Mac, iOS and Android. Once installed, users select folders and files to be backed up at user-specified times. IDrive offers incremental and compressed backups so users only upload modified portions of a backup file, and files may also be updated in real time with a continuous backup option. Users have the ability to limit bandwidth usage during the backup process. The previous 10 versions of a file are automatically retained and IDrive does not automatically delete backup data, even if backup files are deleted on the user's computer. Users can share their files through email, social media sites including Facebook and Twitter, and via a mobile phone application for Android, iPhone and Windows Phone.

IDrive allows a user to back up data from all compatible devices to a single account. The iDrive application runs natively on Windows, OSX, as well as on several models of NAS devices made by Synology, QNap, and Netgear.

IDrive provides multiple data retrieval options. Backup files can be accessed remotely from a web browser or with IDrive's client software. If a user wants access to all backup files, IDrive can ship all backup files on a 3 TB hard drive.

Files on IDrive are stored using 256-bit AES encryption allowing for an optional user-defined key that must be shared with IDrive, but which IDrive claims will not be permanently stored on their servers. IDrive also provides activity reports, backup status reports and shared file reports.

=== IDriveSync ===
IDriveSync allows a user to synchronize files across different devices.

=== IDrive Portable and IDrive Express ===
IDrive Portable is a USB hard drive designed for local backup. The hard drive has 3 terabytes of storage space and runs at 5,400 RPM.

=== IDrive Lite ===
IDrive Lite is a free application for iOS, BlackBerry and Android devices, which allows users to back up their contacts list online. Users can also restore their backup contacts to different devices, even devices that have different operating systems.

=== IDrive EVS ===
In 2012, IDrive released IDrive EVS, a publicly available software development kit and API. The kit, which includes built-in encryption and a command-line API, allows users to create applications for use with IDrive's cloud storage services.

=== IDrive Photos ===
IDrive Photos is a subscription-based app for iOS and Android devices that allows users to back up photos from their phones. By default, photos are saved in their original resolution in cloud storage.

=== IDriveConnect ===
IDriveConnect allows users to access their Google Docs as if they were sitting in a regular folder on their computer.

=== IDrive 360 ===
Endpoint cloud backup for enterprise, IT and Service providers

=== IDrive e2 ===
On April 13, 2022, the company announced IDrive e2, an S3-compatible object storage service. At launch, the platform offered competitive storage rates (US$0.004/GB/month) and free data egress.
