= Device neutrality =

Device neutrality law states that the users have the right of non-discrimination of the services and apps they use, based on platform control by hardware companies.

The term device neutrality is closely connected to net neutrality, and shares a correlation. Net neutrality is a concept that ensures equal access to the internet and Device neutrality is a concept that ensures equal access to applications. In order to achieve an Open Internet, it is necessary that all Internet access layers remain open for competition, i.e., not only the network access layer (which is the focus of net neutrality), but also the application and operating system access layers (which is the focus of device neutrality).

== History and effects ==
The concept was first proposed in Italy in 2014. Member of the Italian Parliament Stefano Quintarelli proposed a bill which states that users should be free to access content and use the applications they wish, provided they are legal, they do not impair safety and security, and they are not in violation of other laws or court orders. A limitation of this freedom by device manufacturers should be examinable on the grounds of anti consumeristic behaviour.

A similar proposal was made by ARCEP, the French regulator for electronic communications, in February 2018.

The Android operating system supports installation of third party software on the devices beyond the Google Play store, albeit with complications and hurdles for the user, whereas Apple Inc. restricts the third party installation of applications.

After a long and in depth-examination and approval by all committees of the Chamber of Deputies and of the Senate, at the verge of the final vote, some articles in mainstream press argued the proposed bill had potential to ban the use of iPhones in Italy while international news outlets and commentators held a less dramatic stand.

In an October 2016 letter from Apple's General Counsel to Spotify, Apple threatened to remove Spotify's app from the App Store for advertising free trials to its own customers. Apple decreed: “What a developer cannot do is seek to use its iOS app as a marketing tool to redirect consumers outside of the app to avoid in-app purchase”.

In 2019 the presidential candidate Sen. Elizabeth Warren has embraced Device Neutrality calling for a structural separation of the Apple Computer's app store from the device manufacturing business to allow app installation from other sources, like competing App stores.

In January 2020 a group of 53 consumer rights and privacy advocacy organizations signed an open letter to Google asking for the right to completely uninstall preinstalled applications.

In August 2020 Apple pulled off the popular Fortnite game by Epic Games from the App Store in retaliation for Epic's refusal to remove an in-app purchase capability alternative to Apple's own payment system which exacts a 30% toll from all payments. Epic denounced Apple's behaviour launching the #FreeFortnite campaign with a parody of the famous 1984 advertisement video that featured Apple as the new Big Brother, and initiating a legal action against what they deem anti-competitive restrictions on mobile device marketplaces.

On December 15, 2020 European Union Vice President Margrethe Vestager and Commissioner Thierry Breton announced the inclusion of Device Neutrality provisions in the final draft of the Digital Markets Act, the new regulation that will regulate digital services in the European Union.

The proposed regulation includes 10 detailed provisions:

1. Allowing app developers to set different prices and conditions for their apps in alternative app stores;
2. Allowing app developers to conclude contracts with consumers also outside of the app store, so that they are not required to use the app store's payment system;
3. Requiring that a provider of a core platform service cannot require (business) users to subscribe to any other core platform service;
4. Requiring device providers to allow users to uninstall any pre-installed apps provided they do not compromise the performance of the OS or device by doing so;
5. Requiring device providers to allow users access to third-party apps, including third-party app stores (but also via side-loading), provided they do not endanger the integrity of the OS or device;
6. Preventing an app store controller preferencing its own apps in search results, or in other ways in their app store;
7. Requiring device providers not to technically restrict the ability of users to switch between apps accessed via the OS;
8. Requiring device providers to allow third party providers of ‘ancillary services’ (which includes payment services) equal access to the OS and device hardware);
9. Requiring app store providers to allow fair and non-discriminatory access by third-party app developers to the app store;
10. Facilitating data portability between devices, thereby reducing switching costs.

In South Korea regulators established non-binding recommendations for pre-installed apps to be removable. In Russia, Android has already been fined for continuing to pre-install its associated Google Apps, and the outgoing chief of the Indian telecom's regulator has suggested device neutrality is necessary to keep the ecosystem lively.
