= I-drive =

I-drive.com
- Early i-drive logo
- Founded: 1998
- Headquarters: San Francisco, CA
- Services: Cloud storage
- Website: www.idrivellc.com

i-drive was a file hosting service that operated from 1998 to 2002.

The name derived from the words "Internet drive".

== History ==
Based in San Francisco, the company was founded in 1998 with seed investors and launched its first product, an online file storage service in August 1999. The idea originated from an early company Jeff Bonforte co-founded in 1996 called ShellServer.net, which provided 10 MB of space for IRC users. Bonforte compiled the founding team, which included Chris Lindland, Patrick Fenton, Tim Craycroft, Rich MacAlmon, John Reddig and Lou Perrelli (the last three were also the company's first angel investors). Originally presented as i-drive.com, the company acquired the domain idrive.com around October 1999. The initial product offered a limited amount of free file storage space, and later enhanced the offering with 'sideloading' – storing files such as MP3 files collected on the World Wide Web without the need for the user to download them to their individual computer. In January 2000, the company began offering unlimited storage space and an application called Filo.

In 2001 the company transitioned from offering the free storage service and transformed the underlying software architecture into a middleware storage mechanism and product, seeking to sell into various markets including the 3G marketplace, targeting companies such as DoCoMo and Earthlink. In January 2002 the company name was changed to Anuvio Technologies. i-drive's assets were acquired by the EMC Corporation in 2002. Certain assets (including the idrive.com domain name) were acquired by Pro Softnet Corp which also offered online storage services. At its height, i-drive hosted over 10 million registered users, employed 110 people, and held partnerships with MP3.com, ZDnet.com, and 40 major universities. The service was rated as a "Top 5 Web Application" by CNET in 2000 and one of the "3 Top Technologies to Watch" by Fortune Magazine in 2000. The company raised over US$30 million from venture capitalists such as Draper Fisher Jurvetson, Information Technology Ventures, Global Retail Partners, Hikari (Japan), Philips (Netherlands), EMC, and Partners Group (Switzerland).
