= Amazon Product Advertising API =

Cloud-based service

Amazon's Product Advertising API, formerly Amazon Associates Web Service (A2S) and before that known as Amazon E-Commerce Service (ECS), is a web service and application programming interface (API) that gives application programmers access to Amazon's product catalog data. Accessible via either the SOAP or REST protocols it enables products to be listed and/or sold through third-party websites and applications. It is a product of Amazon Services, not to be confused with Amazon Web Services.

== Functionality ==
Amazon.com developed the Product Advertising API toward three classifications of users:

- Associates: third-party site owners wishing to build more effective sponsored affiliate links to Amazon products, thus increasing their referral fees
- Vendors: sellers on the Amazon platform looking to manage inventory and receive batch product data feeds
- Developers: third-party developers building Amazon-driven functionality into their applications

The API allows clients to search or browse Amazon.com's product catalog; to retrieve detailed product information, reviews, and images; and to interface with customer shopping carts. Purchases at Amazon through a third-party website or application allows the operators of that site to earn up to 8.5% in referral fees.

== Motivation ==
The motivation behind the free Product Advertising API is to give partners the opportunity to earn money by promoting for Amazon products. The access is given to developers of applications that primarily bring or at least seem to have the potential to bring gains to Amazon.

== See also ==
- Amazon Web Services
