= AltStore =

iOS Sideloading Application

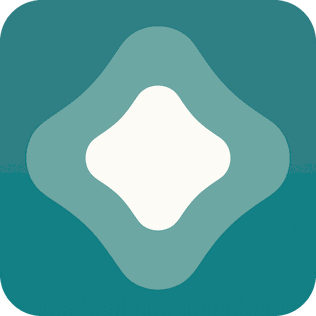

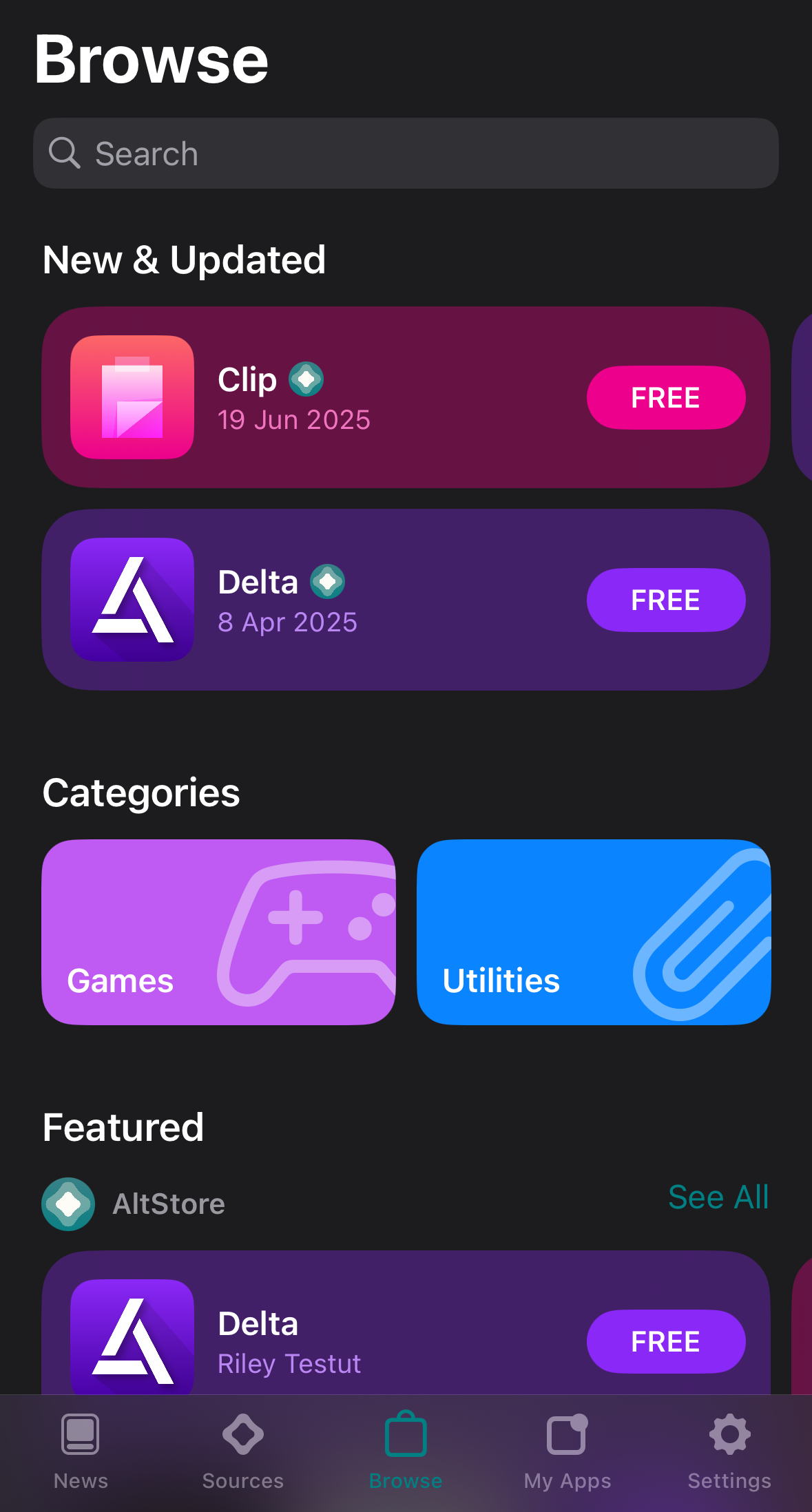
- Screenshot AltStore with the default sources, showing the two apps initially available
- Developer: Riley Testut
- Initial release: 28 September 2019
- Operating system: iOS, iPadOS (client) Windows, macOS (server)
- Type: App store
- License: GNU Affero General Public License
- Website: altstore.io
- Repository: github.com/altstoreio/AltStore

AltStore is an alternative app store for the iOS and iPadOS mobile operating systems, which allows users to download applications that are not available on the App Store, most commonly tweaked apps, jailbreak apps, and apps including paid apps on the app store. It was publicly announced on September 25, 2019, and launched on September 28.

== History ==
Riley Testut is an American developer who began to work on AltStore after Apple declined to allow his Nintendo emulator Delta on the App Store. Since Xcode allowed him to temporarily install his Delta app to his iOS device for 7 days of testing, he created AltStore in 2019 to replicate this functionality, which could be extended to other .ipa files. As of 2022, AltStore had been downloaded 1.5 million times.

In the following years, AltStore expanded beyond its initial sideloading functionality. The platform was founded by Testut, with Shane Gill later joining as co-founder. AltStore was initially supported through Patreon contributions from its user community, and later saw increased adoption following regulatory developments in the European Union that enabled broader third-party app distribution. The project has also been involved in notable industry collaborations, including a partnership with Epic Games.

== Features ==
AltStore exploits a loophole in the Xcode developer platform, which allows developers to sideload their own apps which they are working on without needing to jailbreak. Sideloaded apps are signed like a developer project for testing and will expire after 7 days with a free account or one year with a paid developer account, by which they will need to be refreshed or reinstalled.

== Notes ==
1. AltStore PAL is only available on iPhone.
