= Andrew Samwick =

American economist

Andrew Alan Samwick is an American economist, who served as Chief Economist on the staff of the United States President's Council of Economic Advisors from July 2003 to July 2004. Samwick is currently Professor of Economics at Dartmouth College (since 1994) and the director of the Nelson A. Rockefeller Center for Public Policy and the Social Sciences. He has also held teaching positions at Columbia University’s Graduate School of Business. In 2009, Samwick was named the New Hampshire Professor of the Year by the Carnegie Foundation for the Advancement of Teaching. He is also a current editor of Economics Letters.

== Education ==
Samwick received a Bachelor of Arts, summa cum laude, in economics and was a member of Phi Beta Kappa at Harvard College in 1989. He received his Ph.D. in Economics at the Massachusetts Institute of Technology in 1993. At MIT, he was the recipient of several grants and fellowships including: the National Institute on Aging, Pre-doctoral Training Grant (1992–1993), the Lynde and Harry Bradley Foundation Fellowship (1992–1993) and the National Science Foundation Graduate Fellowship (1989–1992).

== Career ==
Samwick has consulted for the Canadian government, the U.S. Social Security Administration, the Pension Benefit Guaranty Corporation, and the World Bank. Professor Samwick has also offered Congressional testimony on Social Security and retirement issues.

He is a research associate of the National Bureau of Economic Research and the co-organizer of its Social Security Working Group. His research interests include: finance, macroeconomics, Social Security, saving, and taxation. His work has appeared in The American Economic Review, The Journal of Political Economy and The Journal of Finance among others. In 2000, Professor Samwick was awarded Dartmouth's Karen E. Wetterhahn Award for Distinguished Creative or Scholarly Achievement.

Writing on his blog in 2007, Samwick urged his former colleagues in the Bush administration to avoid asserting that the Bush tax cuts paid for themselves, because "No thoughtful person believes [it]... Not a single one."

In 2024, Samwick signed a faculty letter expressing support for Dartmouth College president Sian Beilock, who ordered the arrests of 90 students and faculty members protesting the Gaza war.
