= Hilarion Capucci =

Syrian Catholic bishop

His Excellency, The Most Reverend Hilarion Capucci BA
- Archbishop of Caesarea
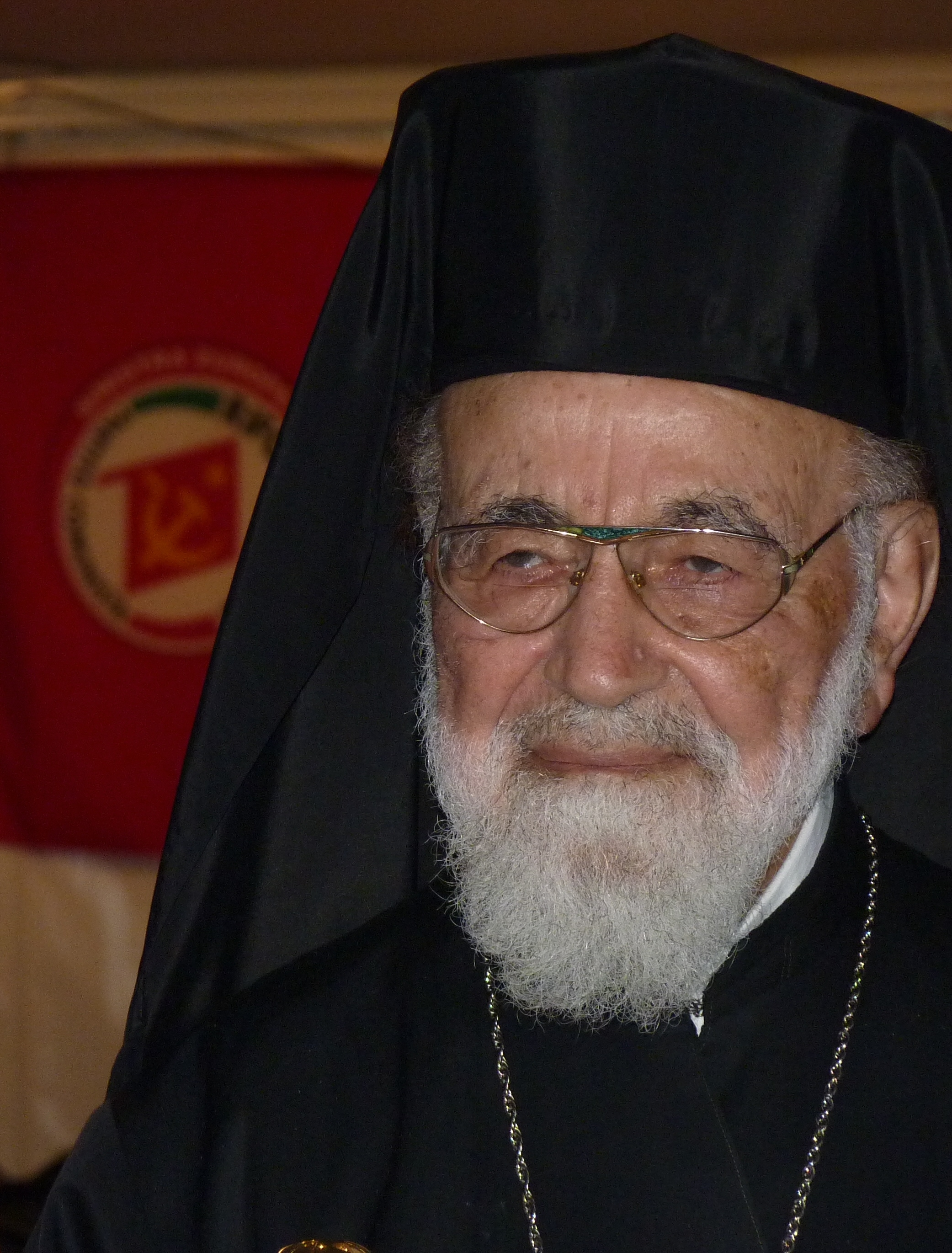
- His Excellency Hilarion Capucci, 2012
- Native name: هيلاريون كابوتشي
- Church: Melkite Greek Catholic
- See: Eparchate of Caesarea
- In office: 9 September 1968 – 24 October 1988

Orders
- Ordination: 20 July 1947
- Consecration: 30 July 1965

Personal details
- Born: 2 March 1922 Aleppo, Syria
- Died: 1 January 2017 (aged 94) Rome, Italy

Hilarion Capucci, BA (Arabic: هيلاريون كابوتشي; 2 March 1922 – 1 January 2017) was a Syrian Catholic prelate who served as the titular Archbishop of Caesarea in the Melkite Greek Catholic Church. He was a member of the Basilian Aleppian Order.

== Early years ==
He was born in Aleppo, Syria to Bashir Capucci (father) and Chafika Rabbath (mother) and was educated at St. Anne's Seminary in Jerusalem. During his time in office, he was an opponent of the Israeli occupation of Palestine, and aligned himself with the Palestinian cause.

On 20 July 1947, he was ordained a priest of the Basilian Aleppian Order. On 30 July 1965, he was elected archbishop and consecrated.

== Arrest and imprisonment ==
On 18 August 1974 he was arrested by security forces of Israel for smuggling weapons into the West Bank in a Mercedes sedan. He was subsequently convicted by an Israeli military court of using his diplomatic status to smuggle arms to the Palestine Liberation Army and sentenced to 12 years in prison.

Maximos V, the patriarch of the Melkite Church, was a vocal critic of Capucci's imprisonment. He was quoted as saying, "Is this Bishop reprehensible if he thought it was his duty to bear arms? If we go back in history we find other bishops who smuggled weapons, gave their lives and committed other illegal actions to save Jews from Nazi occupation. I do not see why a man who is ready to save Arabs should be condemned." Maximos also asserted that Israel had entered East Jerusalem illegally and against United Nations resolutions.

Capucci was among the prisoners whose release was demanded by Palestinian hijackers of the Kfar Yuval hostage crisis in 1975, and of German and Palestinian hijackers of Air France Flight 139 (the Entebbe hostage crisis), in 1976.

He was released two years later, in 1978, due to intervention by the Vatican, after having served four years of the 12-years sentence.

== Negotiating the 1979 Iran hostage crisis ==
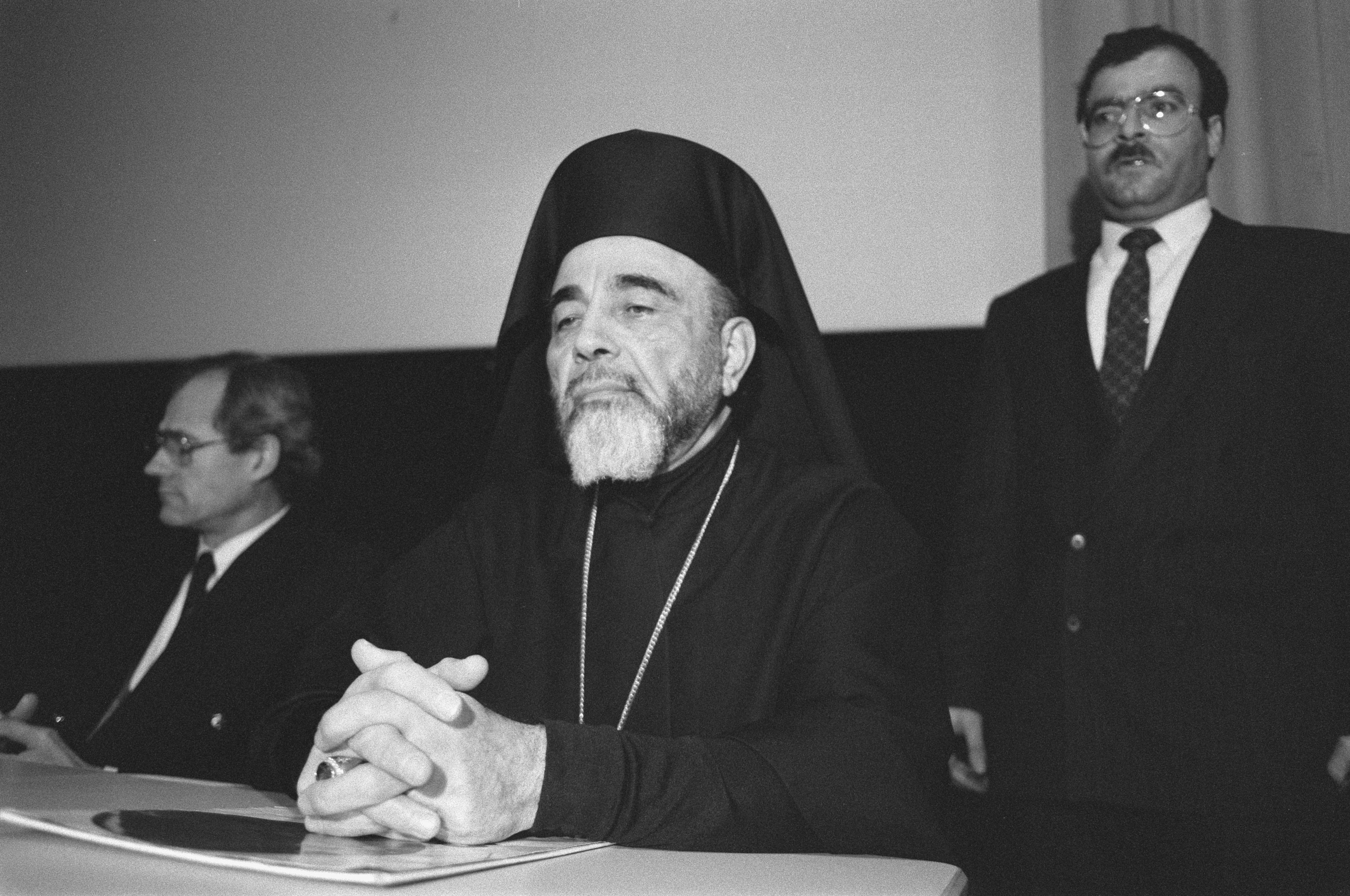
Hilarion Capucci (1988)

Capucci played a key role during the Iran hostage crisis. He made several visits to the hostages, and in early May 1980 he obtained the release of the bodies of the American soldiers who had died in the refueling accident during the rescue mission. Capucci also negotiated an agreement for the release of the hostages, but the plan collapsed because the French press published the story before the agreement had been approved by Iran's Parliament.

== Opposition to the 2003 Iraq War ==
An opponent of the Iraq War, Capucci wrote the foreword for the book Neo-Conned!: Just War Principles a Condemnation of War in Iraq, by John Sharpe.

== Participation aboard the 2009 Gaza aid ship ==
In 2009, Capucci was on a Lebanese ship bound for Gaza which was seized by Israeli forces when the ship attempted to violate the Israeli naval blockade.

== Participation in the 2010 Gaza flotilla ==
In May 2010, Capucci participated in the Free Gaza Movement's aid flotilla to the Gaza Strip (see also 2010 Gaza flotilla raid). He was a passenger on MV Mavi Marmara, which was seized in the early hours of Monday, 31 May, by the Israeli Navy, with nine people killed and many injured. He was held in Beersheba prison and deported. During a reception for the return of the Mavi Marmara to Istanbul, he gave a speech to the assembly.

== Honors by Muslim countries ==
The governments of Iraq, Kuwait, Egypt, Libya, Sudan and Syria have honored Capucci with postage stamps.

== Other ==
On 14 June 2009 he spoke at the American-Arab Anti-Discrimination Committee (ADC) convention's annual Palestine Luncheon.

== Death ==
On 1 January 2017, the Vatican announced that Capucci had died in Rome, aged 94.
