= Hauser's law =

Empirical observation of US federal tax revenues

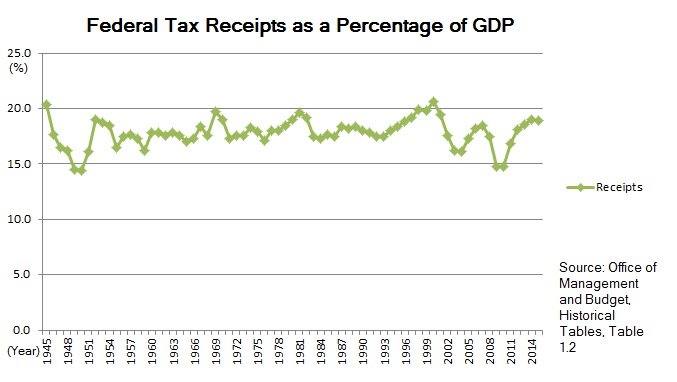
U.S. federal government tax receipts as a percentage of GDP from 1945 to 2015 (note that 2010 to 2015 data are estimated)

Hauser's law is the empirical observation that, in the United States, federal tax revenues since World War II have always been approximately equal to 19.5% of GDP, regardless of wide fluctuations in the marginal tax rate. Historically, since the end of World War II, federal tax receipts as a percentage of gross domestic product averaged 17.9%, with a range from 14.4% to 20.9% between 1946 and 2007.

== History ==
The proposition was first put forward in 1993 by William Kurt Hauser, a San Francisco investment analyst, who wrote,

No matter what the tax rates have been, in postwar America tax revenues have remained at about 19.5% of GDP.

Hauser cited Arthur Laffer's concept of the Laffer curve in his original article. While the two concepts are similar, Hauser's law was put forward as an empirical observation whereas the Laffer curve is a theoretical argument.

In a May 20, 2008 editorial by David Ranson, the Wall St. Journal published a graph showing that even though the top marginal tax rate of federal income tax had varied between a low of 28% to a high of 91%, between 1950 and 2007, federal tax revenues had remained close to 19.5% of GDP. The editorial went on to say,

The economics of taxation will be moribund until economists accept and explain Hauser's law. For progress to be made, they will have to face up to it, reconcile it with other facts, and incorporate it within the body of accepted knowledge.

From fiscal year 1946 to fiscal year 2007, federal tax receipts as a percentage of gross domestic product averaged 17.9%, with a range from 14.4% to 20.9%. 2009 tax collections, at 15% of GDP, were the lowest level of the past 50 years and 4.5 percentage points lower than Hauser's law suggests. The Heritage Foundation has stated that the recent world economic recession pushed receipts to a level significantly below the historical average.

== Commentary and criticism ==
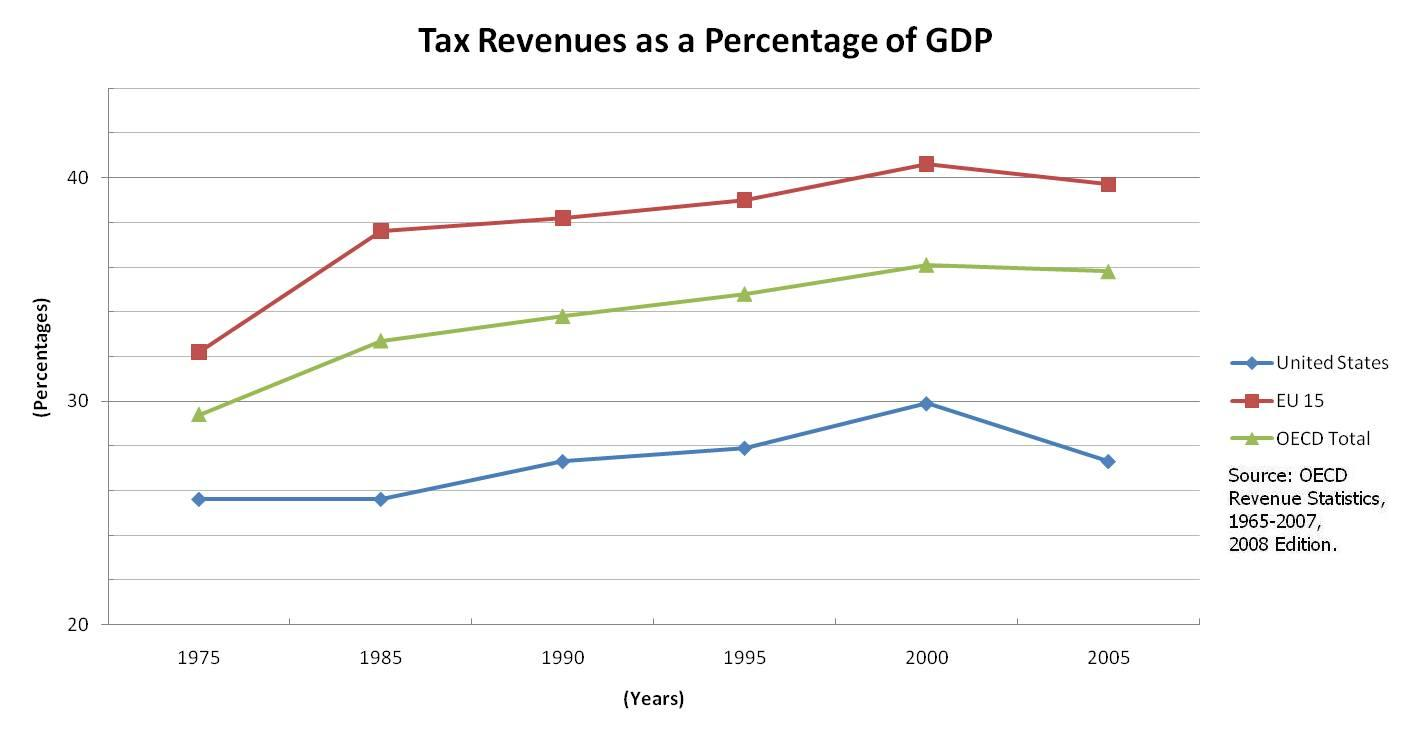
Total tax revenues as a percentage of GDP for the U.S. (in blue) in comparison to the 34 countries of the OECD (in green) and the EU 15 (in red).

Daniel J. Mitchell has argued that Hauser's Law has been observed due to the fact that the U.S. does not have a national sales tax and instead collects taxes in a federalist system, in contrast to many other Western nations. He also stated that the U.S. has an inherently more progressive system as well. Thus, he concluded that the Law represents a socio-political policy trend rather than a true economic law and that the trend could change rapidly if value-added taxes are imposed at the federal level.

Economist Mike Kimel has stated that Hauser's Law is misleading as it sweeps large differences under the table. He wrote that tax revenue is higher in the years following a tax increase and lower in the years following a tax cut. He defined the time periods 1951–1953, 1967–1968, and 1991–2001 as "tax hike eras", and 1953–1967, 1969–1991, 2001–2010 as "tax cut eras", and points out that tax revenues increase in "tax hike eras" and that tax cuts lead to lower revenues. It is misleading to refer to 1969–1984 as part of a "tax cut era", however, as the tax cuts of those times were compensating for bracket creep, as the era combined both high inflation with tax brackets not yet indexed for inflation. The tax cuts of that period merely kept taxes in line with inflation, and should not be conflated with later tax cuts which took place on top of a tax code already indexed for inflation.

Zubin Jelveh criticized the Wall Street Journal editorial for failing to adequately separate social insurance taxes from other types of tax revenues (such as income tax and corporate tax revenue). Because social insurance taxes go directly into the Social Security trust fund, revenue that is not earmarked for pension checks has actually declined as a percentage of GDP over the last 50 years. Jelveh points out that the main reason for this decline is a dramatic decline in corporate tax revenues, from more than 5% of GDP to less than 2%. Jelveh uses these facts to critique editorialist David Ranson's use of Hauser's Law to argue that raising tax rates on the rich will be ineffective at raising revenue.

Journalist Jonathan Chait has written that "swings are fairly dramatic" through U.S. history for tax receipts as a percent of GDP. He stated that the George H. W. Bush and Bill Clinton administrations received "massive" extra revenues as the result of tax increases while the George W. Bush administration tax cuts lead to a "massive" drop in revenues. He labeled the idea of static, flat revenues as a "scam".

== See also ==
- Taxation history of the United States
- List of countries by tax revenue as percentage of GDP
- List of eponymous laws
- National debt by U.S. presidential terms
