= Center for Freedom and Prosperity =

American political advocacy organization

- Abbreviation: CF&P
- Type: Nonprofit organization think tank
- Headquarters: Alexandria, Virginia, U.S.
- President/CEO: Andrew F.Quinlan
- Key people: Brian Garst
- Revenue: $137,500 (2015)
- Expenses: $94,979 (2015)
- Website: www.freedomandprosperity.org

The Center for Freedom and Prosperity (CFP or CF&P) is an American nonprofit organization that advocates for flat taxes, territorial taxation systems, and offshore tax havens. The organization and its subsidiary, Center for Freedom and Prosperity Foundation (a tax-exempt organization), publish studies and conduct seminars analyzing the benefits of jurisdictional tax competition, financial privacy and fiscal sovereignty.

== Background ==
The stated objectives of the CFP are:

- Thwarting the Organisation for Economic Co-operation and Development (OECD)'s attempts to create a cartel of high-tax nations – arguing that tax competition should be celebrated, not persecuted, and advocating that high tax regimes should not be able to shield themselves from globalisation.
- Protecting world commerce and open trade – it asserts that discriminatory financial protectionism against low-tax nations is a bad idea in principle and should be stopped.
- Preserving the ability of sovereign jurisdictions to determine their own tax policy – they oppose high-tax nations trying to export their tax laws to other nations, in effect trying to turn them into adjunct tax collectors, and the OECD trying to dictate tax policy in low-tax jurisdictions.
- Resisting the Financial Action Task Force's (FATF) attempts to restrict financial privacy. Whilst the CFP states that it supports laws against criminals and the proceeds of crime, respect for Constitutional freedoms and civil liberties should not be abandoned. Nor, they advocate, should concerns about money laundering be allowed to serve as a stalking horse for tax collectors.

Daniel J. Mitchell has described the OECD as "a bunch of crazy European socialists".

== Collaborations ==
In 2012, Mitchell’s colleague Andy Quinlan offered to brief Jennifer Mossack, working at Mossack Fonseca on "what CF&P is doing in Washington" and "the current legislative climate on offshore tax and information exchange schemes."
