= Jude Wanniski =

American journalist, conservative commentator, and political economist

Jude Thaddeus Wanniski (June 17, 1936 – August 29, 2005) was an American journalist, conservative commentator, and political economist.

== Early life and education ==
Wanniski was born in Pottsville, Pennsylvania, the son of Constance, who worked at an accounting firm, and Michael Wanniski, an itinerant butcher. His father was of Polish descent and his mother was a Scottish immigrant. When he was still very young, his family moved to Brooklyn, where his father became a book binder. His grandfather was a Pennsylvania coal miner and a dedicated Communist who gave his grandson a copy of Das Kapital for his high school graduation.

== Career ==
After college, Wanniski worked as a reporter and columnist in Alaska. From 1961 to 1965 he worked at The Las Vegas Review-Journal as a political columnist, where he taught himself economics.

In 1965, Wanniski moved to Washington, D.C., to work as a columnist for the National Observer, published by Dow Jones.

From 1972 to 1978, Wanniski was the associate editor of The Wall Street Journal. He left after being discovered at a New Jersey train station distributing leaflets supporting a Republican senatorial candidate, an act considered an ethics violation.

In 1978, Wanniski started Polyconomics, an economics forecasting firm, where he and his analysts advised corporations, investment banks and others.

He also began directly advising politicians on economic policy, first candidate Ronald Reagan and later presidential hopefuls Jack Kemp and Steve Forbes. He helped design the tax cuts made during Reagan's first term in office. His formal role as a Reagan adviser ended after an interview he gave to the Village Voice was published under the headline "The Battle for Reagan's Mind."

In the late 1990s, Wanniski developed a friendship with the controversial leader of the Nation of Islam, Louis Farrakhan, stating in 1997: "My wife Patricia and I spent the four-day July 4th weekend in Chicago at the International Islamic Conference, hosted by the Nation of Islam, in conjunction with the World Islamic Peoples Leadership. It may have been the single most important political event I have witnessed in my life. ... What made the event so important was that when the weekend began, Farrakhan was the spiritual leader of 200,000 members of the Nation of Islam and clearly the most influential of 33 million African-Americans. At its conclusion, Farrakhan stands a good chance at uniting 1.2 billion Muslims under his spiritual leadership."

Polyconomics as a corporation ceased operations on June 30, 2006, ten months after Wanniski's death, but the name (a combination of "politics" and "economics") lives on at The Polyconomics Institute, where one can find the Wanniski's collected works for Polyconomics, as well as correspondence with economic policy makers, and lectures.

== Economic and political beliefs ==
Wanniski consistently advocated the reduction of trade barriers, the elimination of capital gains taxes, and a return to the gold standard.

=== Lower taxes ===
Wanniski was instrumental in popularizing the ideas of lower tax rates embodied in the "Laffer Curve" and was present in 1974 when Arthur Laffer drew the curve on the famous napkin for Dick Cheney and Donald Rumsfeld.

A simplified view of the theory is that tax revenues would be zero if tax rates were either 0% or 100% and somewhere in between 0% and 100% is a tax rate that maximizes total revenue. Laffer's postulate was that the tax rate that maximizes revenue was at a much lower level than previously believed, so low that current tax rates were above the level for revenue to be maximized.

Many economists were skeptical that it was true in practice. Wanniski suggested that the United States was on the wrong side of the Laffer curve.

=== The Two Santa Claus Theory ===
The Two Santa Claus Theory is a political theory and strategy published by Wanniski in 1976, which he promoted within the United States Republican Party. The theory states that in democratic elections, if members of the rival Democratic Party appeal to voters by proposing programs to help people, then the Republicans cannot gain broader appeal by proposing less spending. The first "Santa Claus" of the theory title refers to the Democrats who promise programs to help the disadvantaged. The "Two Santa Claus Theory" recommends that the Republicans must assume the role of a second Santa Claus by not arguing to cut spending but offering the option of cutting taxes.

According to Wanniski, the theory is simple. In 1976, he wrote that the Two-Santa Claus Theory suggests that "the Republicans should concentrate on tax-rate reduction. As they succeed in expanding incentives to produce, they will move the economy back to full employment and thereby reduce social pressures for public spending. Just as an increase in Government spending inevitably means taxes must be raised, a cut in tax rates—by expanding the private sector—will diminish the relative size of the public sector." Wanniski suggested this position, as left-liberal observer Thom Hartmann has clarified, so that the Democrats would "have to be anti-Santas by raising taxes, or anti-Santas by cutting spending. Either one would lose them elections."

=== The Way the World Works ===
Wanniski's 1978 book, The Way the World Works, documented his theory that the United States Senate's floor votes on the Smoot–Hawley tariff legislation coincided day to day with the Wall Street stock market Crash of 1929, and that the Great Depression was the result of the Smoot–Hawley tariff, rather than any failure of classical economics.

=== Iraq ===
Wanniski is also notable for his journalism on the alleged weapons of mass destruction (WMD) in Iraq. As early as 1997, Wanniski posted columns on his website alleging that after November 1991, inspectors of UNSCOM had never found WMD in Iraq but had found and destroyed all of Iraq's WMD programs with the help of Saddam Hussein's regime in the months following the first Gulf War. Wanniski not only recognized the prospective importance of the Iraqi WMD question before other journalists, but also argued correctly that Iraq had no WMD and stated that the US would never allow UNSCOM to end the inspections regime regardless of what Iraq did.

He became a somewhat controversial figure in the conservative movement at the beginning of 2003, when he vocally opposed the impending US war with Iraq. On October 27, 2004, he publicly denounced President George W. Bush, saying, "Mr. Bush has become an imperialist—one whose decisions as commander-in-chief have made the world a more dangerous place." Eventually Wanniski endorsed the 2004 Democratic candidate, Senator John Kerry, although he clearly preferred the Republican platform on issues related to taxation.

Wanniski's last published work was an article for the 2005 IHS Press antiwar anthology, Neo-Conned!.

== Influence ==
Wanniski has been credited with coining the term supply-side economics to distinguish it against the more dominant "demand-side" Keynesian and monetarist theories. He, however, thought the actual phrase should be credited to Herbert Stein, for Stein's phrase "supply-side fiscalists."

The rising GOP star Jack Kemp became a supply-side economics advocate due to Wanniski's tutelage, and would work to put his proposals into legislative practice.

The Way the World Works was named one of the 100 most influential books of the 20th century by National Review magazine. Conservative commentator Robert D. Novak said, in the introduction to the 20th anniversary edition (1998) of the book, that it was one of two books that "shaped [Novak's] mature philosophy of politics and government." (Whittaker Chambers' Witness is the other.)

Starting in 1987, Wanniski edited an annual "Media Guide" in which he rated pundits on a four-star scale. Some conservatives, such as George F. Will and Norman Podhoretz, received only a single star.

In 1998, Wanniski attempted to foster dialogue between Louis Farrakhan and those who had labeled him antisemitic. He arranged for Farrakhan to be interviewed by reporter Jeffrey Goldberg, who had written for the Jewish weekly The Forward and The New York Times. The extensive interview was never published in either publication, and Wanniski posted it on his website in the context of a memorandum to Senator Joe Lieberman.

== Death ==
Wanniski died of a heart attack on August 29, 2005, in Morristown, New Jersey, while working at his desk. He was survived by his wife, Patricia, and children Matthew, Andrew, Jennifer Harlan, his brother Terrance Wanniski and sister Ruth Necco.

At the time of his death, Wanniski was at the low point of his political influence, according to longtime friend Robert Novak. He was running his economic consultancy from its Parsippany offices. He spoke of having many Wall Street clients, although he complained that some had left due to his politics. He posted personal commentaries several times a week on his personal website, on topics ranging from international politics and trade policy to reviews of films.

== See also ==
- Macroeconomics
- Political economy
- Perspectives on capitalism by school of thought
- List of economics topics
