= Chris Burniske =

American entrepreneur and technology writer

Chris Burniske is an American entrepreneur and technology writer. In 2017, he co-founded Placeholder with Joel Monegro and Brad Burnham, a venture capital firm focused on cryptoassets and related infrastructure, with backing from investment firms including Andreessen Horowitz (a16z), ARK Invest, and Union Square Ventures. He is the co-author of the book Cryptoassets: The Innovative Investor's Guide to Bitcoin and Beyond (2017).

== Career ==
In 2015, Burniske led ARK Invest to become the first public fund manager to offer bitcoin exposure through the inclusion of Grayscale's Bitcoin Investment Trust in its investment products.

== Publications ==
Burniske co-authored the book Cryptoassets: The Innovative Investor's Guide to Bitcoin and Beyond (2017) with Jack Tatar. The book introduced the term cryptoassets and argued that most blockchain-based assets are not currencies but fall into new or existing asset categories. It has been cited in academic and professional literature for its early discussion of cryptoasset taxonomy, valuation frameworks, and investment analysis.

In 2016, Burniske collaborated with Coinbase’s Adam White to publish the paper “Bitcoin: Ringing the Bell for a New Asset Class,” which examined how early Coinbase users interacted with bitcoin and made one of the first institutional arguments for considering bitcoin as a distinct and investable asset class.

In 2015, Burniske collaborated with American economist Arthur Laffer to publish “Bitcoin: A Disruptive Currency,” one of the first institutional research papers on bitcoin that argued the asset had the potential to rise well above US$100,000 over time.
