= Tax cut =

Reduction in the tax charged by a government

A tax cut (or tax rate cut) is a reduction in taxes collected by a government. It usually refers to reductions in the percentage of tax paid on income, goods and services. Tax cuts also include reductions in tax in other ways, such as tax credits, deductions, and loopholes.

The effects of a tax cut depend on the type of tax that is cut. Policies that increase disposable income for lower- and middle-income households are more likely to increase overall consumption and "hence stimulate the economy". Tax cuts in isolation may boost the economy because they increase government borrowing. However, they are often accompanied by spending cuts or changes in monetary policy that can offset their stimulative effects.

Sometimes a tax cut can increase tax revenue, as economist Thomas Sowell explains:

"What actually followed the cuts in tax rates in the 1920s were rising output, rising employment to produce that output, rising incomes as a result and rising tax revenues for the government because of the rising incomes, even though the tax rates had been lowered."

During the Coolidge administration, the highest tax rate on personal income was brought down (in steps) from 75% to 25%, with the surprising result that tax revenue increased and also that the richest 1% paid a higher share of taxes.

== Types ==
Tax cuts are typically cuts in the tax rate. However, other tax changes that reduce the amount of tax can also be seen as tax cuts. These include deductions, credits, exemptions, and adjustments. Additionally, adjusting tax brackets may indirectly reduce the amount of income that is subject to higher tax rates.

Term	Definition	Example
Rate cut	A reduction in the fraction of the taxed item that is collected.	An income tax rate cut reduces the percentage of income that is paid in tax.
Deduction	A reduction in the amount of the taxed item that is subject to the tax.	An income tax deduction reduces that amount of taxable income.
Credit	A reduction in the amount of tax paid. Credits are usually fixed amounts.	A tuition tax credit reduces the amount of tax paid by the amount of the credit. Credits can be refundable; i.e., the credit is given to the taxpayer even when no actual taxes are paid (such as when deductions exceed income).
Exemption	The exclusion of a specific item from taxation.	Food might be exempted from a sales tax.
Adjustment	A change in the amount of an item that is taxed based on an external factor.	An inflation adjustment reduces the amount of tax paid by the rate of inflation.

== Predictions about effects ==
Tax cuts generally reduce the amount of tax paid by affected taxpayers, increasing after-tax income. Economists disagree about the extent to which this leads to higher consumer spending, investment, wages, or long-term economic growth, depending on the type of tax cut and broader economic conditions.

Consumer spending is a large component of aggregate demand. This increase in aggregate demand can lead to economic growth if other factors remain consistent. Thus, income tax cuts increase the after-tax rewards of working, saving, and investing, increasing work effort and contributing to economic growth.

If governments reduce taxes without reducing spending or increasing other revenue sources, budget deficits may increase, potentially contributing to higher interest rates and reduced private investment over time. This also decreases national saving and, therefore, reduces the national capital stock and income for future generations. For this reason, the structure of the tax cut and the way it is financed are crucial for achieving economic growth.

=== Supply-side tax cut ===
Supply-side tax cuts are designed to stimulate capital formation by lowering the price level of a good and therefore increasing the demand for the good. Aggregate supply and aggregate demand will be shifted as a result.

=== Corporate income tax cut ===
Corporate income tax cuts generate sustained effects on research and development (R&D) expenditures, productivity, and output, thereby increasing GDP. To evaluate the impact of a given tax policy, studying R&D expenditure and technological adoption is crucial.

=== Personal income tax cut ===
According to the National Bureau of Economic Research, personal income tax cuts only lead to a momentary boost to GDP and productivity, having no long-term effect on GDP as they trigger an extensive but short-lived response of capital expenditure, productivity, and output. The key to evaluating the effect of personal income tax cut is labor utilization.

=== Value-added tax cut ===
Value-added tax (VAT) is a general, broadly based consumption tax assessed on the value added to goods and services and collected fractionally.

Cutting VAT can have significant repercussions on a country's economy. While it may stimulate short-term consumer spending and encourage business investment, there are trade-offs. Lower VAT rates reduce immediate government revenue, potentially impacting public services and infrastructure. However, if managed well, such cuts can contribute to long-term economic growth and fiscal stability. Policymakers must carefully balance the benefits of VAT reduction with the need for sustainable revenue collection.

One notable example of a targeted VAT cut occurred in the UK during the pandemic. The standard rate of VAT dropped from 20% to 5%, specifically for the hospitality sector. This reduction aimed to support struggling businesses and boost consumer spending. However, it is essential to recognize that the main drawback of a VAT reduction is that suppliers are not obligated to pass those savings directly to consumers. Therefore, while a VAT cut may create a small hole in overall VAT revenue, its impact on prices remains uncertain. EU regulations also allow for reduced VAT rates, but several countries have maintained VAT levels above the minimum thresholds.

== Costs and benefits study ==
A 2017 working paper from the IMF posited three major factors regarding the effects of tax cuts:

1. Tax cuts can boost the economy in the short term; however, these effects are generally not strong enough to prevent a loss of revenue.

Any tax cuts will significantly reduce tax revenues initially. The increase in tax revenue from economic growth does not fully offset this effect. Thus, the gap must be financed through an increase in public debt, higher taxes, or reduced spending. Usually, cuts in income tax are offset by increases in consumption taxes, but there are several ways a government may compensate for tax cuts:

a) By spending cuts

The final effect on equity and aggregate demand will be neutral, as some individuals will be better off from tax cuts while others will have to reduce their spending as the government decreases welfare payments. Overall, there is no change in aggregate welfare in the economy.

b) By government borrowing

The government may compensate for the loss in revenue by borrowing money and issuing bonds. The overall result of this type of compensation may vary depending on the state of the economy. In a recession, borrowing would probably result in higher aggregate demand. In a boom, borrowing may result in crowding out—a situation in which the private sector has fewer funds available for investments as it purchases bonds.

c) By cutting taxes in boom

Chancellor Nigel Lawson's tax cuts in 1988 occurred during a period of economic growth. These tax cuts led to a further increase in economic growth; however, they also led to increased inflation, contributing to a boom-and-bust cycle.

d) By improved productivity

If tax cuts lead to a more productive economy, tax revenue may counterintuitively stabilize, provided that the economy grows steadily for a few years.

2. Tax cuts may help low-income groups even if they do not receive them directly.

When the middle or upper class receives tax cuts, they often spend more money on services provided by low-income individuals. On average, wealthier people tend to spend proportionally more of their income on services. With tax cuts, the expenditures of wealthier individuals increase along with the demand for services.

3. There is a trade-off between growth and income inequality, depending on which groups receive tax cuts.

Even though upper-class tax cuts may increase demand for services from the lower-income groups, income inequality and polarization tend to increase. Income tax credits for the lower-income groups do not have as large an impact on the income gap as tax cuts for the upper-income groups. On the other hand, targeting the middle class with tax cuts may reduce income inequality and polarization but may provide lower gains in economic growth.

== Countries ==
=== United States ===
Notable examples of tax cuts in the United States include:

- The Tax Cuts and Jobs Act of 2017 lowered the corporate tax rate to 21%, while also reducing personal income tax rates, among other changes.
- The 2009 American Recovery and Reinvestment Act included a $400 tax credit, lower payroll tax rates, and higher earned income tax credits.
- The Economic Growth and Tax Relief Reconciliation Act of 2001 reduced business and investment taxes.

Tax policy varies by president, who often proposes tax changes, but Congress passes legislation that may or may not reflect those proposals.

==== John F. Kennedy ====
John F. Kennedy's plan was to lower the top personal income tax rate from 91% to 65%; however, he was assassinated before implementing the change.

==== Lyndon B. Johnson ====
Lyndon B. Johnson supported Kennedy's ideas and lowered the top personal income tax rate from 91% to 70% through the Revenue Act of 1964. He reduced the corporate tax rate from 52% to 48%. Federal tax revenue increased from $94 billion in 1961 to $153 billion in 1968.

==== Ronald Reagan ====
Ronald Reagan's policies included tax reforms. His administration implemented two significant tax acts. First, the Economic Recovery Tax Act of 1981 (ERTA) was implemented to stimulate economic growth, incentivize investment, and reduce the tax burden on individuals and businesses. Key provisions included lowering the highest personal income tax rate from 70% to 50% and reducing the capital gains tax rate from 28% to 20%. The ERTA decreased federal revenue initially. The Tax Reform Act of 1986 (TRA) followed the ETRA. The TRA built upon the ERTA, further reshaping the tax code with tax cuts. The highest personal income tax rate was reduced to 38.5% initially and eventually to 28%. The corporate tax rate also decreased, benefiting businesses. In 1988, Reagan cut the corporate tax rate from 48% to 34%. The TRA simplified the tax structure by reducing the number of brackets. While the TRA aimed for efficiency and fairness, it did not fully offset the revenue losses from previous tax cuts.

The 1980s witnessed economic expansion, often referred to as the "Reagan boom". In 1983, 1984, and 1985, the GDP grew by 4.6%, 7.2%, and 4.2%, respectively.

While the tax cuts contributed to this growth, other factors such as Federal Reserve actions, increased federal spending, and business investment also played roles. The tax cuts worsened budget deficits in the short term, but the economic expansion eventually led to lower deficits. After peaking in 1986, the federal deficit gradually declined through 1989.

==== George W. Bush ====
George W. Bush's tax cuts were implemented to help address the 2001 recession. They reduced the top personal income tax rate from 39.6% to 35%, the long-term capital gains tax rate from 20% to 15%, and the top dividend tax rate from 38.6% to 15%.

Although these tax cuts boosted the economy, they increased the U.S. debt by $1.35 trillion over a 10-year period. These tax cuts primarily targeted high-income individuals.

==== Barack Obama ====
Barack Obama implemented several tax cuts to combat the Great Recession.

The $787 billion American Recovery and Reinvestment Act of 2009 included $288 billion in tax cuts and incentives. Its taxation aspects included a 2% payroll tax cut, health care tax credits, a $400 reduction in income taxes for individuals, and improvements to child tax credits and earned income tax credits.

To prevent the fiscal cliff in 2013, Obama extended the Bush tax cuts for incomes below $400,000 for individuals and $450,000 for married couples. Incomes exceeding the threshold were taxed at a rate of 39.6% (the Clinton-era tax rate), following the American Taxpayer Relief Act of 2012.

==== Donald Trump ====
Donald Trump signed the Tax Cuts and Jobs Act in 2017, which reduced the corporate tax rate from 35% to 21%.

Other changes included income tax rate cuts, doubling of the standard deduction, capping the state and local tax deduction, and eliminating personal exemptions.

GDP growth rate increased by 0.7% in 2018; however, in 2019 it fell below 2017 levels. In 2020, GDP experienced a sharp downturn, likely due to the COVID-19 pandemic.

==== Joe Biden ====
Joe Biden proposed several tax policies during his presidency. His 2025 budget included tax breaks for millions of families, low-income workers, and senior citizens. One significant proposal was the revival of the expanded Child Tax Credit (CTC), which helped lift millions of children out of poverty during the pandemic. Under Biden's plan, the expanded CTC would provide $3,000 per child aged six years and older and $3,600 for each child under six. Additionally, Biden supported continuing tax cuts for families making less than $400,000, but opposed extending tax cuts for higher earners. His goal was to pay for these tax breaks by raising taxes on corporations and the wealthy.

=== United Kingdom ===
==== Margaret Thatcher ====
Margaret Thatcher's policies included several tax cuts. Thatcher's government significantly lowered income tax rates. The top rate was reduced from 83% in 1979 to 40% by 1988. The basic rate also decreased from 33% to 25% during the same period. These cuts aimed to encourage work, entrepreneurship, and investment, ultimately stimulating economic growth. To offset the revenue loss from income tax cuts, Thatcher's administration raised the VAT rate from 8% to 15%. The increased VAT became a significant source of government revenue. The trade-off between income tax reduction and higher VAT sparked debate. Thatcher's strategy also included tax cuts for corporations. By 1986, the rate had fallen to 35%, down from the 52% rate on businesses in the late 1970s. These cuts aimed to enhance the UK's competitiveness, attract investment, and foster business growth.

While the tax cuts spurred economic activity, critics argued that they disproportionately benefited the wealthy. Poverty rates increased during Thatcher's tenure, with child poverty more than doubling.

=== Germany ===
==== Gerhard Schröder ====
During his tenure as Chancellor of Germany from 1998 to 2005, Gerhard Schröder implemented significant tax-cut policies aimed at stimulating economic growth and improving the country's competitiveness. One notable move was the acceleration of income tax reductions in 2004, which lowered income tax levels by 10%. This reduction left approximately €18 billion in federal, state, and local government coffers. Schröder planned to finance these tax cuts through a combination of measures: reducing subsidies, privatization revenues, and increasing state debt. His goal was to signal of economic revival and boost consumer confidence. However, Schröder faced criticism and pressure to denounce his business and political ties to Russia, particularly in light of Moscow's war in Ukraine. Despite the controversies, Schröder's tax policies left a lasting impact on Germany's fiscal landscape.

=== Argentina ===
==== Javier Milei ====
Javier Milei's tax-cut policies were aimed at transforming the country's financial landscape. Milei proposed a tax reform known as the Ómnibus Law. One of its central tenets was the elimination of the top marginal tax rate. Over time, this would gradually reduce the tax burden for high-net-worth individuals from 1.75% to 0.5% by 2027.

== Multiplier effect ==
With cuts in tax rates, households have higher disposable incomes. Some of this disposable income is spent or invested, stimulating the economy. This phenomenon is known as the multiplier effect. The effect represents the relationship between money spent on economic activity and the reduction in taxes or an increase in government spending. "The Fiscal Multiplier and Economic Policy Analysis in the United States," a 2015 study by J. Whalen and F. Reichling, focused on the short-term effects of tax cuts and the economy's potential. The results showed that the effects of tax cuts or spending increases are dependent on the economic situation. If the economy is close to its potential and the Federal Reserve is not constrained by zero interest rates, tax cuts have small short-run economic effects, mostly because fiscal stimulus was outperformed by interest rate hikes. On the other hand, if the economy is further fromits potential and is constrained by zero interest rates, the effect of fiscal stimulis is much higher. The US Congressional Budget Office estimated that the weak economy's multiplier effect potential is three times higher than that of a strong economy. The study largely highlights uncertainty about fiscal policies. The study shows large differences between the low and high estimates of the multiplier effect of tax cuts. On the other hand, the study indicated that government spending is a more reliable form of fiscal policy than tax cuts.

== Tax cuts and productivity ==
The relationship between tax rates and government revenue is often depicted by the Laffer curve. Experience has shown that, with a continuous increase in tax rates, at one point, the tax revenues eventually begin to decrease. This phenomenon can be explained by a decrease in individuals' willingness to work as the government takes away a larger share of their income. The apex of the curve represents the revenue-maximizing point for the government.

The Laffer curve is often criticized for its abstractness, as it is in reality very difficult to find the revenue-maximizing point. It is highly dependent on society and its preferences, which are often fluid, while the model simplifies reality into general tax revenues and tax rates. It also assumes a single tax rate and a single labor supply. Furthermore, it does not take into account that tax revenues are not always a continuous function, although at higher tax rates people may avoid taxes through tax avoidance and tax evasion. All these factors introduce uncertainty into the location of the revenue-maximizing point. Nevertheless, the theoretical basis of the Laffer curve is often used to justify tax increases or decreases.

== Reasons ==
Governments may cite several reasons for cutting taxes.

=== Fairness ===
To begin with, money belongs to the person who possesses it, particularly if they earned it. Reducing the amount of money taken by the government can be seen as increasing fairness. However, if tax cuts are financed by cutting government spending, it can be argued that this disproportionately disadvantages low-income earners, as spending cuts affect services used mainly by low-income earners, who pay proportionately less tax.

=== Tax equity ===
There are two main concepts of equity in taxation: horizontal equity and vertical equity. The former focuses on the belief that all individuals should face the same tax burden. The latter highlights the importance of the equal relative tax burden, the so-called ability-to-pay principle, resulting in the belief that those with higher income should be taxed more heavily.

=== Efficiency ===
Tax cuts can increase efficiency in the market. Cutting taxes can lead to a more efficient allocation of resources than would be the case with higher taxes. Generally, private entities are more efficient in their spending than governments. Tax cuts allow private entities to use their money more efficiently.

=== Incentives ===
High taxes generally discourage work and investment. When taxes reduce the return from work, it is not surprising that workers are less willing to work. Taxes on income create a wedge between what the employee keeps and what the employer pays. Higher taxes encourage employers to create fewer jobs than they would under lower taxes.

=== Tax burden ===
Tax burden refers to the indirect responsibility of paying taxes, irrespective of the legal taxpayer. In the US, the overall tax burden in 2020 was equal to 16% of the total gross domestic product.

== See also ==
- Laffer curve
- Rahn curve
- Reaganomics
- Starve the beast
- Trickle-down economics
- S corporation
- Tax reform
