= Richard W. Rahn =

American economist

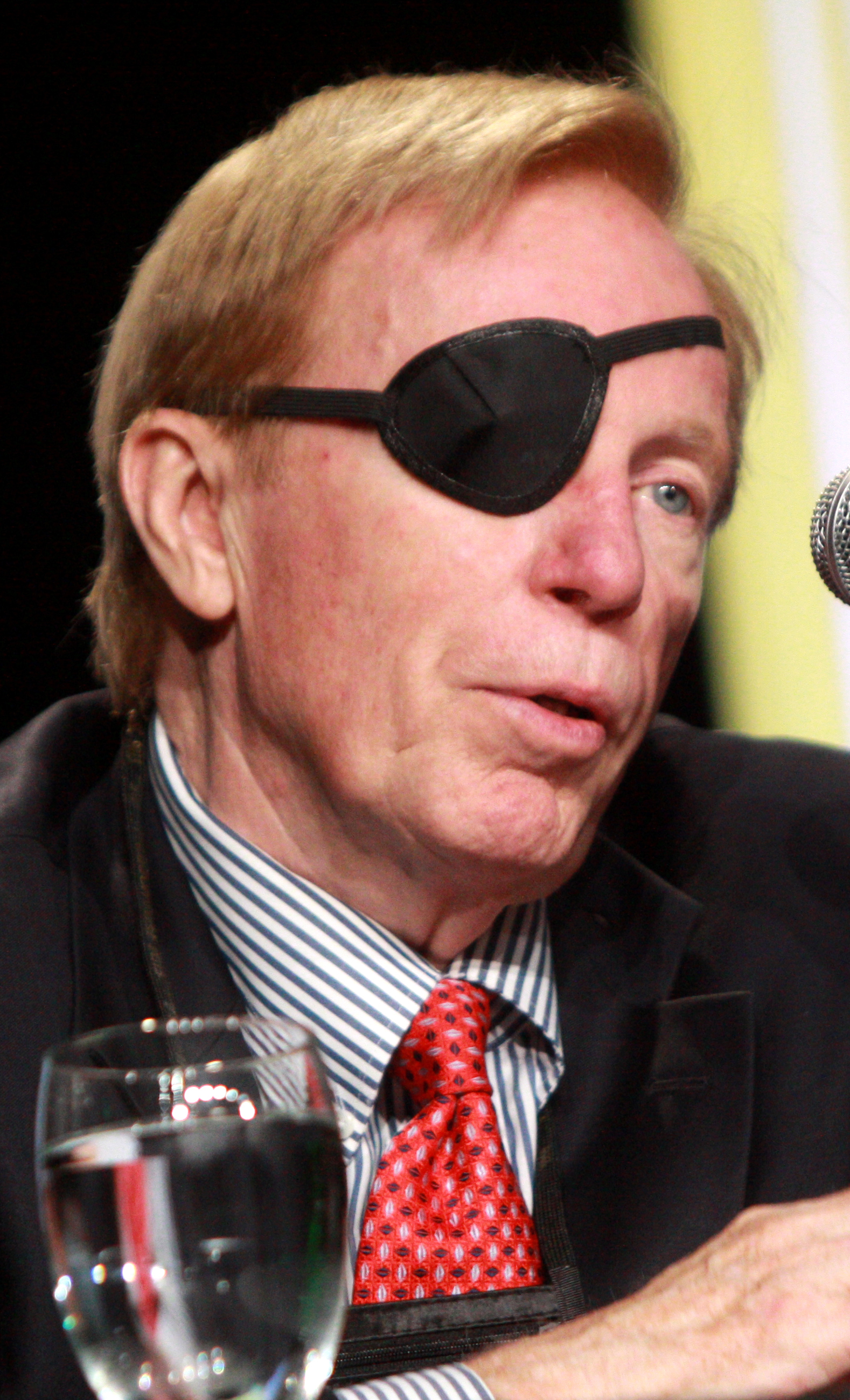
Rahn in July 2013

Richard W. Rahn (born January 9, 1942, in Rochester, New York) is an American economist, syndicated columnist, and entrepreneur. He is chairman of Improbable Success Productions and the Institute for Global Economic Growth. Rahn writes a syndicated weekly economic column which is published in The Washington Times, Real Clear Markets and elsewhere. He was the vice president and chief economist of the United States Chamber of Commerce during the Reagan administration and remains a staunch advocate of supply-side economics, small government, and classical liberalism.

== Education ==
Rahn received a B.A. from University of South Florida, an M.B.A. from Florida State University, a Ph.D. from Columbia University, and an honorary Doctor of Laws from Pepperdine University.

== Career ==
In addition to his column in The Washington Times, his articles have appeared in The New York Times, The Wall Street Journal, The American Spectator, National Review, and overseas publications. He is the author of the book The End of Money and the Struggle for Financial Privacy (1999). As an economic commentator, he has appeared on such programs as The Today Show, Good Morning America, Kudlow and Co., Wall Street Week, PBS Newshour and Crossfire, and was a weekly commentator for Radio America. He has testified before the U.S. Congress on economic issues more than seventy-five times.

In the 1980s, Rahn was the vice president and chief economist of the Chamber of Commerce of the United States, executive vice president and board member of the National Chamber Foundation, and was the editor-in-chief of the Journal of Economic Growth. Previously, he was the executive director of the American Council for Capital Formation. In 1990–1991, he served as the U.S. co-chairman of the Bulgarian Economic Growth and Transition Project. In 1982, President Ronald Reagan appointed Rahn as a member of the Quadrennial Social Security Advisory Council. In 1988–1989, he was an economic advisor to President George H. W. Bush.

In 1990, Rahn founded the Novecon companies, which included Novecon Financial Ltd., Novecopter, and Sterling Semiconductor (now owned by Dow Corning).

From 2002 to 2008, he served for two terms as the first non-Caymanian member on the board of directors of the Cayman Islands Monetary Authority.

Rahn is a member of the Mont Pelerin Society, and is a member of the board of the American Council for Capital Formation and the Small Business & Entrepreneurship Council and the editorial board of the Cayman Financial Review. He has served as a senior fellow at the Cato Institute, the Hudson Institute, and the Discovery Institute; as a visiting fellow at The Heritage Foundation, and as a National Executive Director of the Ripon Society.

== Academic career ==
In 1986, Rahn argued there is an optimal level of government spending (15–25%) for maximizing economic growth, a thesis which has become known as the Rahn curve.

Rahn has taught at Florida State, George Mason, George Washington, and Rutgers Universities, at the Institute of World Politics, and the Polytechnic University of New York, where he was head of the graduate Department of Management. He also was an instructor for the U.S. Air Force and the Washington economic advisor for the New York Mercantile Exchange.

Rahn is chairman of the Institute for Global Economic Growth, an organization that assists nations in implementing supply-side or "pro-growth" reforms. According to his biography on the IGEG website, he is a member of the Mont Pelerin Society, sits on the boards of numerous think-tanks and advocacy groups, and has testified on economic issues before the U.S. Congress over seventy-five times. Rahn is also a former adjunct professor at the Institute of World Politics.

== Personal life ==
In November 1985, he married Peggy Noonan, his third marriage and her first. They have one son, Will, born in 1987. Rahn had previously been married to Joy Moore. They have one daughter, Margie, born in 1963. Noonan and Rahn were divorced in 1990.

== Books ==
- The End of Money: and the Struggle for Financial Privacy. Seattle, Washington: Discovery Institute. 1999. ISBN 0963865420 – via Internet Archive.
