= Daniel J. Mitchell =

Libertarian economist, professor

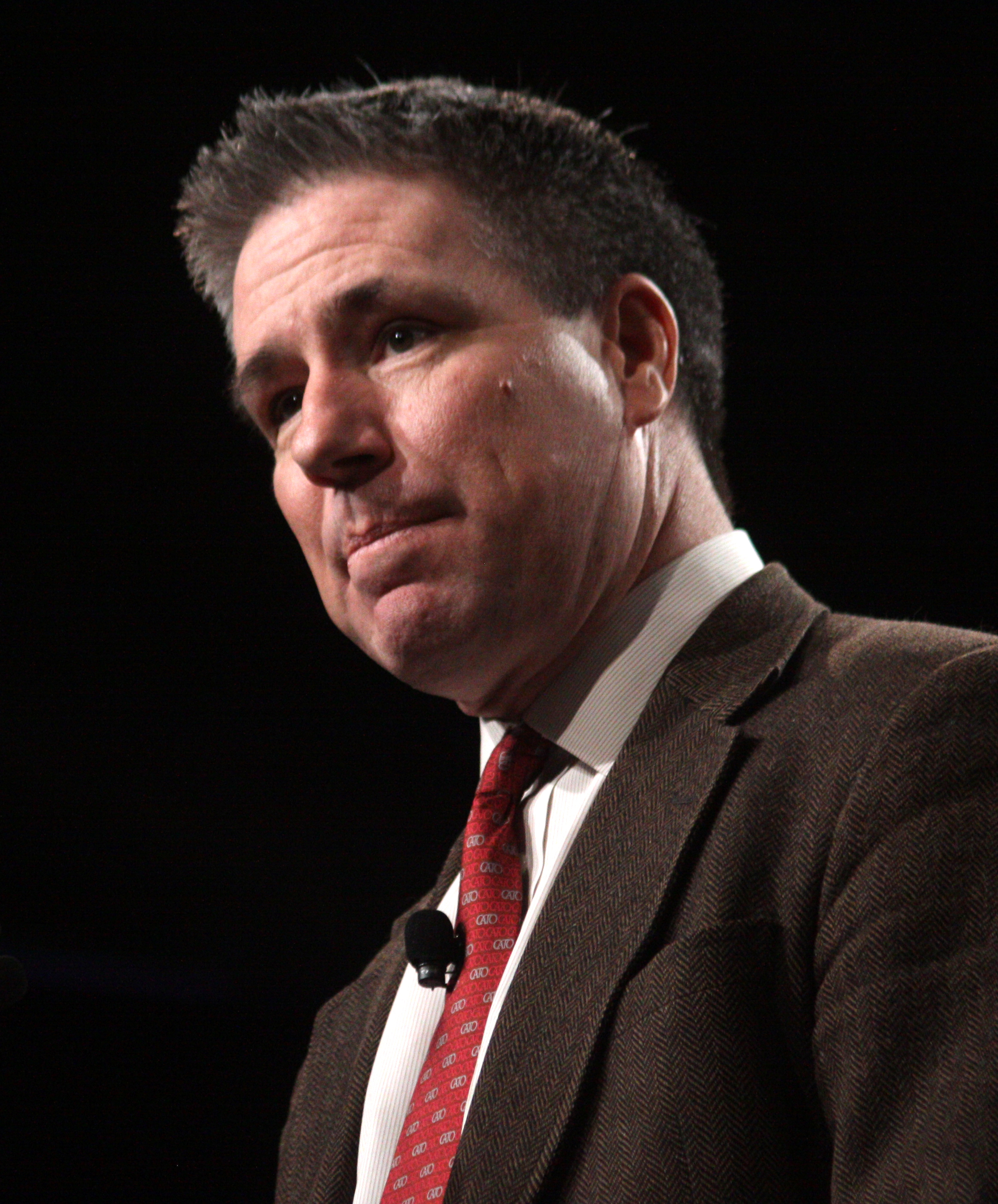
Mitchell in February 2011

Daniel J. "Dan" Mitchell is a libertarian economist and former senior fellow at the Cato Institute. He is a proponent of the flat tax and tax competition, financial privacy, and fiscal sovereignty.

== Early life and education ==
Mitchell was born on June 30, 1958, in Mount Kisco, New York, and grew up in Wilton, Connecticut. He graduated from Wilton High School in 1976, and went on to attend the University of Georgia in Athens, Georgia, where he graduated in 1981 with a bachelor's in economics. He then earned a master's degree in economics from the University of Georgia in 1985. At the University of Georgia, Mitchell was a member of Phi Kappa Theta fraternity.

In 1985, Mitchell moved to the Washington metropolitan area to begin pursuing a Ph.D. in economics at George Mason University in Fairfax, Virginia.

== Career ==
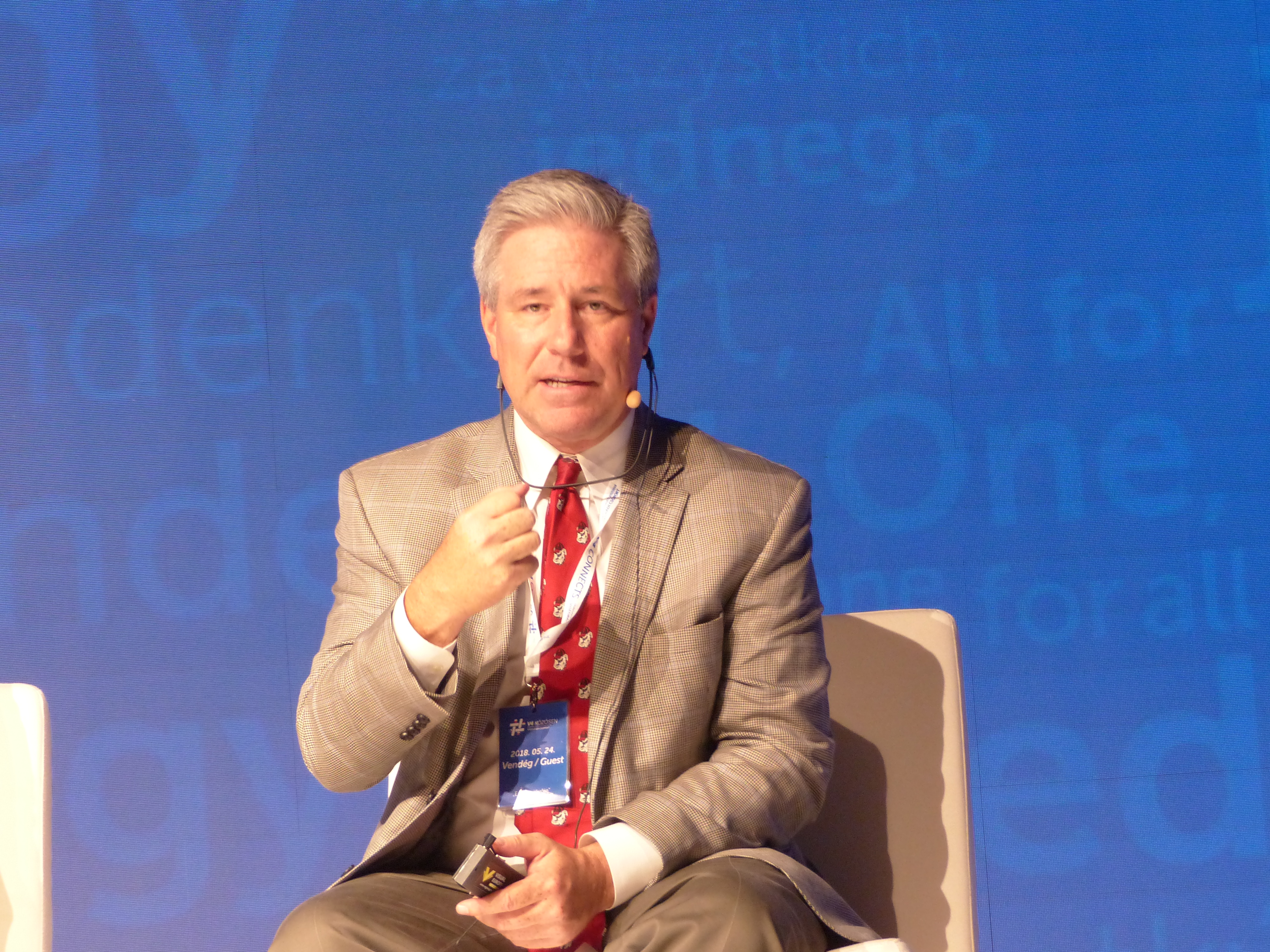
Mitchell in May 2018

Mitchell's career as an economist began in the United States Senate, working for Oregon senator Bob Packwood and the Senate Finance Committee. He also served on the transition team of President-elect George H. W. Bush and Vice President-elect Quayle in 1988.

In 1990, he began work at the Heritage Foundation, where he worked on tax policy issues and began advocating for income tax reform. In 2007, Mitchell left The Heritage Foundation, and joined the Cato Institute as a senior fellow. Mitchell continues to work in tax policy, and deals with issues such as the flat tax and international tax competition.

In addition to his Cato Institute responsibilities, Mitchell co-founded the Center for Freedom and Prosperity, an organization formed to protect international tax competition.

=== Publications ===
Mitchell's work has been published in The Wall Street Journal, The New York Times, The Washington Times, The Washington Post, National Review, Villanova Law Review, Public Choice, Emory Law Journal, Forbes, USA Today, Playboy, Investor's Business Daily, and other publications.

He is the author of Flat Tax: Freedom, Fairness, Jobs, and Growth (1996), and co-author with Chris Edwards of Tax Revolution: The Rise of Tax Competition and the Battle to Defend It (2008).

Mitchell's daily blog is "Liberty – Restraining Government in America and Around the World", in which he writes about economic issues related to sustainable freedom and prosperity.

=== Television appearances and videos ===
Mitchell is a frequent commentator on television and has appeared on all the major networks, including CBS, NBC, ABC, FOX, CNN, CNBC, and C-SPAN. He currently makes a weekly appearance on Street Signs on CNBC on Mondays at 2:00 pm ET until 2015.

Mitchell narrates a YouTube video series for the Center of Freedom and Prosperity on topics such as flat tax, tax havens, and Keynesian economics.
