= Jack Tatar =

American technology writer

Jack Tatar is an American technology writer, best known for co-authoring the book Cryptoassets: The Innovative Investor's Guide to Bitcoin and Beyond (2017) on cryptoassets with Chris Burniske.
