= Rahn curve =

Graph of economic growth theory

Rahn curve

The Rahn curve is a graph used to illustrate an economic theory, proposed in 1996 by American economist Richard W. Rahn, which suggests that there is a level of government spending that maximizes economic growth. The theory is used by classical liberals to argue for a decrease in overall government spending and taxation. The inverted-U-shaped curve suggests that the optimal level of government spending is 15–25% of GDP.

== See also ==
- Government spending
- Laffer curve
- Tax cut
