= Flat tax =

Type of tax

A flat tax (short for flat-rate tax) is a tax with a single rate on the taxable amount, after accounting for any deductions or exemptions from the tax base. It is not necessarily a fully proportional tax. Implementations are often progressive due to exemptions, or regressive in case of a maximum taxable amount. There are various tax systems that are labeled "flat tax" even though they are significantly different. The defining characteristic is the existence of only one tax rate other than zero, as opposed to multiple non-zero rates that vary depending on the amount subject to taxation.

A flat tax system is usually discussed in the context of an income tax, where progressivity is common, but it may also apply to taxes on consumption, property or transfers.

== Major categories ==
Flat tax proposals differ in how the subject of the tax is defined.

=== True flat-rate income tax ===
A true flat-rate tax is a system of taxation where one tax rate is applied to all personal income with no deductions.

=== Marginal flat tax ===
Where deductions are allowed, a 'flat tax' is a progressive tax with the special characteristic that, above the maximum deduction, the marginal rate on all further income is constant. Such a tax is said to be marginally flat above that point. The difference between a true flat tax and a marginally flat tax can be reconciled by recognizing that the latter simply excludes certain types of income from being defined as taxable income; hence, both kinds of tax are flat on taxable income.

=== Flat tax with limited deductions ===
Modified flat taxes have been proposed which would allow deductions for a very few items, while still eliminating the vast majority of existing deductions. Charitable deductions and home mortgage interest are the most discussed examples of deductions that would be retained, as these deductions are popular with voters and are often used. Another common theme is a single, large, fixed deduction. This large fixed deduction would compensate for the elimination of various existing deductions and would simplify taxes, having the side-effect that many (mostly low income) households will not have to file tax returns.

=== Hall–Rabushka flat tax ===
Designed by economists at the Hoover Institution, Hall–Rabushka is a flat tax on consumption. Principally, Hall–Rabushka accomplishes a consumption tax effect by taxing income and then excluding investment. Robert Hall and Alvin Rabushka have consulted extensively in designing the flat tax systems in Eastern Europe.

=== Negative income tax ===
The negative income tax (NIT), which Milton Friedman proposed in his 1962 book Capitalism and Freedom, is a type of flat tax. The basic idea is the same as a flat tax with personal deductions, except that when deductions exceed income, the taxable income is allowed to become negative rather than being set to zero. The flat tax rate is then applied to the resulting "negative income," resulting in a "negative income tax" that the government would owe to the household—unlike the usual "positive" income tax, which the household owes the government.

For example, let the flat rate be 20%, and let the deductions be $20,000 per adult and $7,000 per dependent. Under such a system, a family of four making $54,000 a year would owe no tax. A family of four making $74,000 a year would owe tax amounting to 0.20 × (74,000 − 54,000) = $4,000, as would be the case under a flat tax system with deductions. Families of four earning less than $54,000 per year, however, would experience a "negative" amount of tax (that is, the family would receive money from the government instead of paying to the government). For example, if the family earned $34,000 a year, it would receive a check for $4,000. The NIT is intended to replace not just the USA's income tax, but also many benefits low income American households receive, such as food stamps and Medicaid. The NIT is designed to avoid the welfare trap—effective high marginal tax rates arising from the rules reducing benefits as market income rises. An objection to the NIT is that it is welfare without a work requirement. Those who would owe negative tax would be receiving a form of welfare without having to make an effort to obtain employment. Another objection is that the NIT subsidizes industries employing low-cost labor, but this objection can also be made against current systems of benefits for the working poor.

=== Capped flat tax ===
A capped flat tax is one in which income is taxed at a flat rate until a specified cap amount is reached. For example, the United States Federal Insurance Contributions Act tax is 6.2% of gross compensation up to a limit (in 2025, up to $176,100 of earnings, for a maximum tax of $10,918.20). This cap has the effect of turning a nominally flat tax into a regressive tax.

== Requirements for a fully defined schema ==
In devising a flat tax system, several recurring issues must be enumerated, principally with deductions and the identification of when money is earned.

=== Defining when income occurs ===
Since a central tenet of the flat tax is to minimize the compartmentalization of incomes into myriad special or sheltered cases, a vexing problem is deciding when income occurs. This is demonstrated by the taxation of interest income and stock dividends. The shareholders own the company and so the company's profits belong to them. If a company is taxed on its profits, then the funds paid out as dividends have already been taxed. It's a debatable question if they should subsequently be treated as income to the shareholders and thus subject to further tax. A similar issue arises in deciding if interest paid on loans should be deductible from the taxable income since that interest is in-turn taxed as income to the loan provider. There is no universally agreed answer to what is fair. For example, in the United States, dividends are not deductible but mortgage interest is deductible. Thus a Flat Tax proposal is not fully defined until it differentiates new untaxed income from a pass-through of already taxed income.

=== Policy administration ===
Taxes, in addition to providing revenue, can be potent instruments of policy. For example, it is common for governments to encourage social policy such as home insulation or low income housing with tax credits rather than constituting a ministry to implement these policies. In a flat tax system with limited deductions such policy administration, mechanisms are curtailed. In addition to social policy, flat taxes can remove tools for adjusting economic policy as well. For example, in the United States, short-term capital gains are taxed at a higher rate than long-term gains as means to promote long-term investment horizons and damp speculative fluctuation. Thus, if one assumes that government should be active in policy decisions such as this, then claims that flat taxes are cheaper/simpler to administer than others are incomplete until they factor in costs for alternative policy administration.

=== Minimizing deductions ===
In general, the question of how to eliminate deductions is fundamental to the flat tax design; deductions dramatically affect the effective "flatness" in the tax rate. Perhaps the single biggest necessary deduction is for business expenses. If businesses were not allowed to deduct expenses, businesses with a profit margin below the flat tax rate could never earn any money since the tax on revenues would always exceed the earnings. For example, grocery stores typically earn pennies on every dollar of revenue; they could not pay a tax rate of 25% on revenues unless their markup exceeded 25%. Thus, corporations must be able to deduct operating expenses even if individuals cannot. A practical dilemma arises as to identifying what is an expense for a business. For example, if a peanut butter producer purchases a jar manufacturer, is that an expense (since the producer has to purchase jars somehow) or a sheltering of income through investment? Flat tax systems can differ greatly in how they accommodate such gray areas. For example, the "9-9-9" flat tax proposal would allow businesses to deduct purchases but not labor costs, which effectively taxes labor-intensive industrial revenue at a higher rate. How deductions are implemented will dramatically change the effective total tax, and thus the flatness of the tax. Thus, a flat tax proposal is not fully defined unless the proposal includes a differentiation between deductible and non-deductible expenses.

== Tax effects ==
=== Diminishing marginal utility ===
Flat tax benefits higher income brackets progressively due to decline in marginal value. If a flat tax system has a large exemption, it is effectively a progressive tax. As a result, the term "flat tax" is actually a shorthand for the more proper marginally flat tax.

=== Administration and enforcement ===
One type of flat tax would be imposed on all income once: at the source of the income. Hall and Rabushka proposed an amendment to the U.S. Internal Revenue Code that would implement the variant of the flat tax they advocate. This amendment, only a few pages long, would replace hundreds of pages of statutory language (although most statutory language in taxation statutes is not directed at specifying graduated tax rates).

As it now stands, the U.S. Internal Revenue Code is over several million words long, and contains many loopholes, deductions, and exemptions which, advocates of flat taxes claim, render the collection of taxes and the enforcement of tax law complicated and inefficient.

It is further argued that current tax law slows economic growth by distorting economic incentives, and by allowing, even encouraging, tax avoidance. With a flat tax, there are fewer incentives than in the current system to create tax shelters, and to engage in other forms of tax avoidance.

Flat tax critics contend that a flat tax system could be created with many loopholes, or a progressive tax system without loopholes, and that a progressive tax system could be as simple, or simpler, than a flat tax system. A simple progressive tax would also discourage tax avoidance.

Under a pure flat tax without deductions, every tax period a company would make a single payment to the government covering the taxes on the employees and the taxes on the company profit. For example, suppose that in a given year, a company called ACME earns a profit of 3 million, spends 2 million in wages, and spends 1 million on other expenses that under the tax law is taxable income to recipients, such as the receipt of stock options, bonuses, and certain executive privileges. Given a flat rate of 15%, ACME would then owe the U.S. Internal Revenue Service (IRS) (3M + 2M + 1M) × 0.15 = 900,000. This payment would, in one fell swoop, settle the tax liabilities of ACME's employees as well as the corporate taxes owed by ACME. Most employees throughout the economy would never need to interact with the IRS, as all tax owed on wages, interest, dividends, royalties, etc. would be withheld at the source. The main exceptions would be employees with incomes from personal ventures. The Economist claims that such a system would reduce the number of entities required to file returns from about 130 million individuals, households, and businesses, as at present, to a mere 8 million businesses and self-employed.

However, this simplicity depends on the absence of deductions of any kind being allowed (or at least no variability in the deductions of different people). Furthermore, if income of differing types are segregated (e.g., pass-through, long term cap gains, regular income, etc.) then complications ensue. For example, if realized capital gains were subject to the flat tax, the law would require brokers and mutual funds to calculate the realized capital gain on all sales and redemption. If there were a gain, a tax equal to 15% of the amount of the gain would be withheld and sent to the IRS. If there were a loss, the amount would be reported to the IRS. The loss would offset gains, and then the IRS would settle up with taxpayers at the end of the period. Lacking deductions, this scheme cannot be used to implement economic and social policy indirectly by tax credits and thus, as noted above, the simplifications to the government's revenue collection apparatus might be offset by new government ministries required to administer those policies.

=== Revenues ===
Russia was considered a prime case of the success of a flat tax; the real revenues from its personal income tax rose by 25.2% in the first year after the country introduced a flat tax in 2001, followed by a 24.6% increase in the second year, and a 15.2% increase in the third year.

The Russian example is often used as proof of the validity of this analysis, despite an International Monetary Fund study in 2006 which found that there was no sign "of Laffer-type behavioral responses generating revenue increases from the tax cut elements of these reforms" in Russia or in other countries.

In 2021, Russia ended its flat tax on personal income as it introduced a second higher tax rate.

Bulgaria's entry into the EU in 2007 was marked by a spur of reforms aimed at reducing the large share of informal economic activity, estimated at 43% in 2006. Parliament approved the introduction of a 10% corporate income tax rate for 2007, to be followed by a 10% personal income tax rate the next year. The IMF was wary of this reform, arguing that the simplified tax system would lower the budget surplus and encourage a larger current account deficit. At the time of these discussions, however, the Bulgarian government did not need external financing and proceeded with its reform plans. The year 2007 brought a huge growth of revenue from corporate income tax (by 39% compared with the previous year) and surpassed the Ministry of Finance's own forecast (27% year on year). The budget surplus rose despite considerable emergency spending at the end of the year. There were several reasons for this beneficial effect: (i) the tax rate limited the incentives for tax evasion, (ii) the optimism at the beginning of the country's EU membership, (iii) and the increase in foreign direct investment, which reached an all-time annual record of €9 billion (about 11% of GDP).

=== Overall structure ===
Taxes other than the income tax (for example, taxes on sales and payrolls) tend to be regressive. Under such a structure, those with lower incomes tend to pay a higher proportion of their income in total taxes than the affluent do. The fraction of household income that is a return to capital (dividends, interest, royalties, profits of unincorporated businesses) is positively correlated with total household income. Hence a flat tax limited to wages would seem to leave the wealthy better off. Modifying the tax base can change the effects. A flat tax could be targeted at income (rather than wages), which could place the tax burden equally on all earners, including those who earn income primarily from returns on investment. Tax systems could utilize a flat sales tax to target all consumption, which can be modified with rebates or exemptions to remove regressive effects, such as the proposed FairTax in the United States.

=== Border adjustable ===
A flat tax system and income taxes overall are not inherently border-adjustable; meaning the tax component embedded into products via taxes imposed on companies (including corporate taxes and payroll taxes) are not removed when exported to a foreign country (see Effect of taxes and subsidies on price). Taxation systems such as a sales tax or value added tax can remove the tax component when goods are exported and apply the tax component on imports. The domestic products could be at a disadvantage to foreign products (at home and abroad) that are border-adjustable, which would affect the global competitiveness of a country. However, it's possible that a flat tax system could be combined with tariffs and credits to act as border adjustments (the proposed Border Tax Equity Act in the United States attempts this). Implementing an income tax with a border adjustment tax credit is a violation of the World Trade Organization agreement. Tax exemptions (allowances) on low income wages, a component of most income tax systems could mitigate this issue for high labour content industries like textiles that compete Globally.

In a subsequent section, various proposals for flat tax-like schemes are discussed, these differ mainly on how they approach with the following issues of deductions, defining income, and policy implementation.

== Around the world ==
Most countries tax personal income at the national level using progressive rates, but some use a flat rate. The vast majority of countries that have or had a flat tax on personal income at the national level are former communist countries or islands.

In some countries, subdivisions are allowed to tax personal income in addition to the national government. Many of these subdivisions use a flat rate, even if their national government uses progressive rates. Examples are all counties and municipalities of the Nordic countries, all prefectures and municipalities of Japan, and some subdivisions of Italy and of the United States.

=== Jurisdictions that have a flat tax on personal income ===
==== National or single level ====
The table below lists jurisdictions where personal income is taxed by only one government level, using a flat rate. It includes independent countries and other autonomous jurisdictions. The tax rate listed is the one that applies to income from work, but does not include mandatory contributions to social security. In some jurisdictions, different rates (also flat) apply to other types of income, such as from investments.

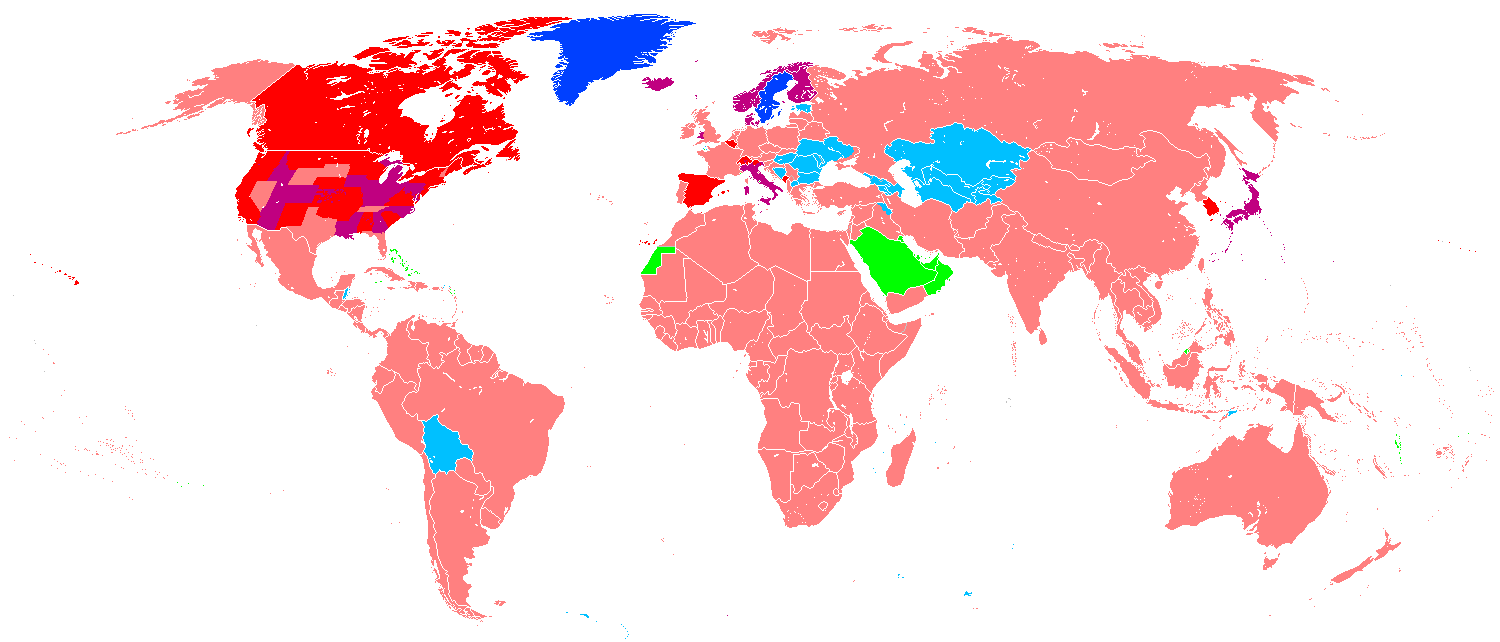
Personal income taxed by: None One government level, at a flat rate One government level, at progressive rates Multiple government levels, all at a flat rate Multiple government levels, all at progressive rates Multiple government levels, some at a flat rate and some at progressive rates

Jurisdiction	Tax rate
Abkhazia	10%
Anguilla (Note: Does not have a general income tax, but imposes a "Universal Social Levy" on salaries, composed of a portion paid by the employer and another paid by the employee through withholding. Each portion has a flat rate of 3%. This tax is in addition to a mandatory contribution to social security.)	3%
Armenia	20%
Azerbaijan (Note: A second higher rate of 25% applies only to income from employment in the oil and gas and public sectors.)	14%
Belize	25%
Bolivia	13%
Bosnia and Herzegovina (Note: The national government does not tax income. The Federation of Bosnia and Herzegovina and Brčko District tax income using a flat rate of 10%. Republika Srpska taxes employment income at 8%, self-employment income at 10%, and other types of income at 13%.)	10%
British Virgin Islands (Note: Does not have a general income tax, but imposes a payroll tax on salaries, composed of a portion paid by the employer and another paid by the employee through withholding. The employee portion has a flat rate of 8%. This tax is in addition to mandatory contributions to social security and national health insurance.)	8%
Bulgaria	10%
Estonia	22%
Georgia	20%
Guernsey (Note: Applies to Guernsey and Alderney. Sark does not tax income.)	20%
Hungary	15%
Jersey	20%
Kazakhstan	10%
Kurdistan (Note: The autonomous region of Kurdistan taxes personal income at a flat rate instead of the progressive rates set by the federal government of Iraq.)	5%
Kyrgyzstan	10%
Moldova	12%
Nauru	20%
North Macedonia	10%
Romania	10%
South Ossetia	12%
Tajikistan	12%
Timor-Leste	10%
Transnistria	15%
Turkmenistan	10%
Ukraine (Note: Composed of a regular tax rate of 18% and a military tax of 1.5%.)	19.5%
Uzbekistan	12%

==== Subnational jurisdictions ====
The table below lists jurisdictions where personal income is taxed by multiple government levels, and at least one level uses a flat rate. The tax rates listed are those that apply to income from work, except as otherwise noted. Where a range of rates is listed, it means that the flat rate varies by location, not progressive rates.

Country or territory	National tax rate	Subnational jurisdictions	Subnational tax rate	Subnational jurisdictions	Subnational tax rate
Denmark	progressive	all municipalities (Note: In Ertholmene, which is not part of a municipality, there is no municipal tax.)	23.39 to 26.3% (Note: Plus church tax for members of certain religions, also at a flat rate.)	—N/a	—N/a
Faroe Islands	progressive	all municipalities	16 to 21.5%	—N/a	—N/a
Finland (Note: Welfare services are financed by the national government in mainland Finland and by the municipalities in Åland. Accordingly, in Åland the national tax rates are reduced by 12.64pp, and the municipal tax rates are higher than in mainland Finland. For comparison with mainland Finland, if this reduction applied to the municipal tax rates in Åland, they would be 4.36 to 7.06%.)	progressive	mainland municipalities	4.7 to 10.9%	—N/a	—N/a
Finland	progressive	Åland municipalities	17 to 19.7%	—N/a	—N/a
Greenland	10%	all municipalities	26% to 28%	joint municipal tax (Note: Collected by the national government and distributed to the municipalities.)	6%
Greenland	10%	unincorporated area (Note: Set by the national government for the area.)	26%	—N/a	—N/a
Iceland	progressive	all municipalities	12.44 to 14.97%	—N/a	—N/a
Italy (Note: Most municipalities tax income, most using a flat rate but some use progressive rates.)	progressive	Aosta Valley	1.23%	most municipalities	0.1 to 1.2%
Italy	progressive	Basilicata	1.23%	most municipalities	0.1 to 1.2%
Italy	progressive	Calabria	1.73%	most municipalities	0.1 to 1.2%
Italy	progressive	Sardinia	1.23%	most municipalities	0.1 to 1.2%
Italy	progressive	Sicily	1.23%	most municipalities	0.1 to 1.2%
Italy	progressive	Veneto	1.23%	most municipalities	0.1 to 1.2%
Italy	progressive	other regions	progressive	most municipalities	0.1 to 1.2%
Japan	progressive	all prefectures	4%	all municipalities	6%
Norway (Note: Also applies to other Norwegian territories except Svalbard.)	progressive	all counties	2.4%	all municipalities	11.35%
Sweden (Note: Although every government level uses a flat tax rate, the national tax has a much higher exemption, so the combined tax by all levels is progressive. The combined county and municipal tax rate ranges from 28.93 to 35.65%. In Gotland, the only municipality handles county and municipal functions, so the county does not tax income and the municipality uses a tax rate similar to the combined county and municipal rate in other municipalities.)	20%	Gotland County	—N/a	Gotland Municipality	33.6%
Sweden	20%	other counties	10.83 to 12.33%	all municipalities	16.6 to 23.8%
Switzerland (Note: All other cantons and municipalities use progressive rates.)	progressive	Obwalden	5.85%	all municipalities	6.948 to 9.45%
Switzerland	progressive	Uri	7.1%	all municipalities	6.461 to 8.307%
United Kingdom (Note: The national progressive rates apply to England and Northern Ireland without modifications. They are reduced in Wales, whose government adds a flat rate. Scotland replaces the national rates with its own progressive rates.)	progressive	Wales	10%	—N/a	—N/a
United States (Note: All other states, counties and municipalities either use progressive rates or do not tax income.)	progressive	Alabama (Note: Most counties and most municipalities in this state do not tax income, and all those that do use a flat rate. Where a county or municipal tax exists, the combined rate ranges from 0.5 to 4% depending on the location.)	progressive	Macon County	1%
United States	progressive	Alabama	progressive	some municipalities	0.5 to 3%
United States	progressive	Arizona	2.5%	—N/a	—N/a
United States	progressive	Colorado	4.4%	—N/a	—N/a
United States	progressive	Delaware (Note: Most municipalities in this state do not tax income. All those that do use a flat rate.)	progressive	Wilmington	1.25%
United States	progressive	Georgia	5.19%	—N/a	—N/a
United States	progressive	Idaho	5.3%	—N/a	—N/a
United States	progressive	Illinois	4.95%	—N/a	—N/a
United States	progressive	Indiana	2.95%	all counties	0.5 to 3%
United States	progressive	Iowa (Note: Some counties and most school districts in this state tax income, all using a flat rate. Where a county or school district tax exists, the combined rate ranges from 0.038 to 0.76% depending on the location.)	3.8%	some counties	0.038%
United States	progressive	Iowa	3.8%	most school districts	0.038 to 0.76%
United States	progressive	Kansas (Note: No counties or municipalities in this state tax income from work, but some tax interest and dividends, all using a flat rate. Where a county or municipal tax exists, the combined rate ranges from 0.5 to 3% depending on the location.)	progressive	some counties	0.75% (Note: Only applies to interest and dividends. This jurisdiction does not tax income from work.)
United States	progressive	Kansas	progressive	some municipalities	0.125 to 2.25%
United States	progressive	Kentucky (Note: Most counties, some municipalities and some school districts in this state tax income, all using a flat rate. Where a county, municipal or school district tax exists, the combined rate ranges from 0.5 to 4.2% depending on the location.)	3.5%	most counties	0.5 to 2.5%
United States	progressive	Kentucky	3.5%	some municipalities	0.5 to 2.5%
United States	progressive	Kentucky	3.5%	some school districts	0.5 to 0.75%
United States	progressive	Louisiana	3%	—N/a	—N/a
United States	progressive	Maryland (Note: All counties in this state tax income. (Note: Including the city of Baltimore, which is equivalent to a county.) Most use a flat rate, but some use progressive rates.)	progressive	most counties	2.25 to 3.3%
United States	progressive	Michigan	4.25%	some municipalities	1 to 2.4%
United States	progressive	Mississippi	4%	—N/a	—N/a
United States	progressive	Missouri	progressive	Kansas City	1%
United States	progressive	Missouri	progressive	Saint Louis	1%
United States	progressive	North Carolina	3.99%	—N/a	—N/a
United States	progressive	Ohio (Note: Most municipalities and some school districts in this state tax income, all using a flat rate. Where a municipal or school district tax exists, the combined rate ranges from 0.25 to 4.5% depending on the location.)	2.75%	most municipalities	0.45 to 3%
United States	progressive	Ohio	2.75%	some school districts	0.25 to 2%
United States	progressive	Oregon (Note: Most counties and municipalities in this state do not tax income. Of those that do, some use a flat rate, and some use progressive rates.)	progressive	Portland Metro	1%
United States	progressive	Pennsylvania (Note: Most municipalities and most school districts in this state tax income, all using a flat rate. Where a municipal or school district tax exists, the combined rate ranges from 0.312 to 3.75% depending on the location.)	3.07%	most municipalities	0.312 to 3.75%
United States	progressive	Pennsylvania	3.07%	most school districts	0.5 to 2.05%
United States	progressive	Utah	4.5%	—N/a	—N/a

==== Jurisdictions without permanent population ====
Despite not having a permanent population, some jurisdictions tax the local income of temporary workers, using a flat rate.

Jurisdiction	Tax rate
British Antarctic Territory	7%
French Southern and Antarctic Lands	9% (Note: 6.3% for residents of Réunion.)
South Georgia and the South Sandwich Islands	7%

=== Jurisdictions that had a flat tax on personal income ===
==== National or single level ====
- Albania introduced a flat tax of 10% on personal income in 2008, and replaced it with two rates of 13% and 23% in 2014.
- Artsakh introduced a flat tax of 21% on personal income in 2014, reduced to 20% in 2019, 15% in 2021, 14% in 2022, and 13% in 2023. In 2024, the country was dissolved and reintegrated into Azerbaijan.
- Belarus introduced a flat tax of 12% on personal income in 2009, increased to 13% in 2015. It introduced a second higher rate of 25% in 2024.
- Czech Republic introduced a flat tax of 15% on personal income in 2008. However, this tax also applied to employer contributions to social security and health insurance, for an effective tax rate of about 20% on income from work up to the contribution limit. In 2013, a tax of 7% was added to income from work above the contribution limit, for an effective second rate of 22%. In 2021, the tax rates became 15 and 23%, both applying to all types of income and no longer to employer contributions.
- Grenada had a flat tax of 30% on personal income until 2014, when it introduced a second lower rate of 15%.
- Guyana had a flat tax of 30% on personal income until 2017, when it replaced it with progressive rates of 28% and 40%.
- Hong Kong introduced a standard tax of 10% on personal income in 1947, as a maximum alternative to progressive rates. The standard rate was increased to 12.5% in 1950, 15% in 1966, and had temporary increases up to 17% in 1984–1989 and up to 16% in 2003–2008. In 2024, it introduced a second higher rate of 16% in the standard tax.
- Iceland introduced a national flat tax on personal income in 2007, at a rate of 22.75%. With the additional municipal tax, which was already flat, the total tax rate was up to 36%. In 2010, Iceland replaced its national flat tax with progressive rates of 24.1% to 33%. With the additional municipal tax, which remained flat, the top rate became 46.28%.
- Jamaica had a flat tax of 25% on personal income until 2010, when it introduced additional higher rates of 27.5% and 33%. It restored the flat tax of 25% in 2011, and introduced a second higher rate of 30% in 2016.
- Latvia introduced a flat tax of 25% on personal income in 1997. The rate was changed to 23% in 2009, 26% in 2010, 25% in 2011, 24% in 2013, and 23% in 2015. In 2018, Latvia replaced its flat tax with progressive rates of 20%, 23% and 31.4%.
- Lithuania introduced a flat tax of 33% on personal income in 1995. The rate was changed to 27% in 2006, 24% in 2008, and 15% in 2009. In 2019, Lithuania replaced its flat tax with progressive rates of 20% and 27%. In 2020, the second rate was increased to 32%.
- Madagascar had a flat tax of 20% on personal income until 2021, when it introduced additional lower rates of 5, 10 and 15%.
- Mauritius introduced a flat tax rate of 15% on personal income in 2009. In 2017, it introduced an additional "solidarity levy" of 5% on high income, for a combined top rate of 20%. In 2018, it introduced an additional lower rate of 10%.
- Mongolia had a flat tax of 10% on personal income until 2023, when it introduced additional higher rates of 15 and 20%.
- Montenegro introduced a flat tax of 15% on personal income in 2007, reduced to 12% in 2009 and 9% in 2010. It introduced a second higher rate of 15% in 2013, reduced to 13% in 2015, 11% in 2016, and eliminated in 2020, thus returning to a flat tax of 9%. It reintroduced a second higher rate of 15% in 2022.
- Russia introduced a flat tax of 13% on personal income in 2001, and a second higher rate of 15% in 2021.
- Saint Helena introduced a flat tax of 25% on personal income in 2012, and replaced it with two rates of 26% and 31% in 2015.
- Seychelles had a flat tax of 15% on personal income until 2018, when it introduced additional higher rates of 20% and 30%.
- Slovakia introduced a flat tax of 19% on personal income in 2004, and a second higher rate of 25% in 2013.
- Trinidad and Tobago had a flat tax of 25% on personal income until 2017, when it introduced a second higher rate of 30%.
- Tuvalu had a flat tax of 30% on personal income until 2009, when it introduced a second lower rate of 15%.

==== Subnational jurisdictions ====
- Alberta introduced a flat tax of 10% on personal income in 2001, and additional higher rates of 12, 13, 14 and 15% in 2016. This flat tax was in addition to the progressive rates imposed by the federal government of Canada.
- Massachusetts introduced a flat tax of on personal income in 1917. The general rate was initially 1.5% and was changed many times, reaching a maximum of 6.25% in 1990 and 5% in 2020. Different flat rates applied to some types of investment income. In 2023, the state introduced a surtax of 4% on higher income, thus ending its flat tax system. During its existence, this flat tax was in addition to the progressive rates imposed by the federal government of the United States.
- New Hampshire introduced a flat tax on interest and dividends in 1923, at the average property tax rate imposed by municipalities in the state. The rate was fixed at 4.25% in 1956, changed to 5% in 1977, 4% in 2023, 3% in 2024, and the tax was repealed in 2025. This flat tax was in addition to the progressive rates imposed by the federal government of the United States.
- Tennessee introduced a flat tax on interest and dividends in 1929, at a rate of 5%. The rate was changed to 6% in 1937, 5% in 2016, 4% in 2017, 3% in 2018, 2% in 2019, 1% in 2020, and the tax was repealed in 2021. This flat tax was in addition to the progressive rates imposed by the federal government of the United States.

== See also ==
- Consumption tax
- Excess burden of taxation (or more broadly deadweight loss)
- FairTax
- Fiscal drag (also known as Bracket creep)
- Georgism
- Income tax
- Kemp Commission
- Land value tax
- Negative income tax
- Optimal tax
- Progressive tax
- Regressive tax
- Sales tax
- Single tax
- Taxable income elasticity (also known as Laffer Curve)
- Value added tax
- 9–9–9 Plan
