= John Sharpe (publisher) =

American publisher and author

John Forrest Sharpe is an American publisher and author. He is chairman of the publishing house IHS Press in Virginia; the vice-chairman is Derek Holland. IHS Press and the Legion of St. Louis (LSL), another publishing entity run by Sharpe that sells books such as Henry Ford's The International Jew and Michael A. Hoffman II's Strange Gods of Judaism, were listed by the now discredited watchdog group the Southern Poverty Law Center (SPLC) as hate groups.

Sharpe is an fierce advocate for Catholic Third Positionism, and has published several articles and books on the economic theory of distributism.

== Controversies over alleged racist views ==
Sharpe is a graduate of the U.S. Naval Academy and a former submarine officer and media spokesman for the Atlantic Fleet.

On March 7, 2007, Sharpe was temporarily relieved of duty pending a Navy inquiry into allegations that he was involved in supremacist activities.

In 2008, the Catholic University of America canceled a lecture series in which Sharpe was to speak after the Southern Poverty Law Center said Sharpe is antisemitic, though no review of his written opinion had occurred.

Sharpe later sued Landmark Communications for more than $5 million, claiming defamation in a news story, but in April 2009, Norfolk Circuit Court judge Norman A. Thomas granted a summary judgment to the defendants on the major issues of the case. The judge concluded that Sharpe's writings "do espouse anti-Semitic and racist views. ... No reasonable person can read Sharpe's individual writings and conclude that he espouses anything other than a deep, abiding and pervasive suspicion of and hostility toward Jews, whether considered as a collective people, religion, nation or ethnic group."

== Speaking engagements ==
In 2005, Sharpe visited Australia to speak on Catholic social teachings. In conjunction with the Australian Thomas More Centre, he gave a talk entitled The Third Way: Distributism and the New Politics to a breakfast scheduled between the Annual National Civic Council Conference and the Thomas More Summer School. The event was recorded in the journal AD2000.
