= Taxable income elasticity =

Concept in public economics

The taxable income elasticity, or the elasticity of taxable income with respect to the net-of-tax rate, is a concept in public economics that measures how reported taxable income responds to changes in marginal tax rates, expressed with respect to the net-of-tax rate (one minus the marginal tax rate). As an elasticity, it shows the percentage change in taxable income if the net-of-tax rate increases by one percent. It is used in the analysis of income tax policy because it summarises behavioural margins that affect the income tax base, including real responses (such as changes in labour supply) and reporting responses (such as changes in deductions, income shifting, tax avoidance and tax evasion). Under certain assumptions, the elasticity can be used as a sufficient-statistic input for estimating the deadweight loss of income taxation and for deriving optimal marginal tax rates in optimal tax models.

== Behavioural channels ==
Changes in marginal tax rates can affect taxable income through both real and reporting responses. Real responses include changes in work effort, hours worked and other forms of economic activity. Reporting responses include changes in the form and timing of compensation, income shifting across tax bases or time, changes in deductible expenditure and evasion. This aggregation property is one reason the elasticity is used in welfare and revenue analysis when modelling each behavioural margin separately is impractical.

== Welfare and revenue analysis ==
In settings where taxable income is the relevant tax base, the excess burden (or deadweight loss) of income taxation can be expressed as a function of the marginal tax rate and the elasticity of taxable income, under stated assumptions about how behavioural responses translate into welfare costs. Martin Feldstein argued that focusing narrowly on labour supply can understate efficiency costs when avoidance margins that reduce reported taxable income are available. Subsequent work clarified conditions under which reduced-form elasticities are sufficient for welfare analysis and when additional elements (such as fiscal externalities from shifting across tax bases) must be incorporated explicitly.

== Empirical estimation ==
Empirical estimation typically uses administrative tax return data and quasi-experimental variation in marginal tax rates created by tax reforms, applying methods such as difference-in-differences designs and panel approaches. A central identification challenge is separating tax-induced changes from mean reversion and underlying trends in the income distribution, which can bias simple before-and-after comparisons around reforms.

Reviews and meta-analyses document substantial heterogeneity in published estimates and sensitivity to empirical choices (including income controls and tax-base definitions). Jonathan Gruber and Emmauel Saez analysed multiple United States tax reforms and reported an overall elasticity around 0.4 in their preferred specifications, with heterogeneity across taxpayer groups and tax-base definitions. In a literature review, Emmanuel Saez, Joel Slemrod and Seth Giertz concluded that 0.25 is a reasonable midpoint in the literature. Another literature review of 61 studies found an average elasticity of 0.29 when analyzing income before deductions and 0.4 after deductions, with a median follow-up period of three years. A study on Danish data argues that standard empirical designs mainly identify short-run earnings elasticities, whereas accounting for job mobility and career dynamics implies a substantially larger long-run elasticity, which the authors estimate to be around 0.5.

== Role in optimal tax analysis ==
The elasticity is used in optimal income tax analysis because it links marginal tax rates to behavioural responses and revenue effects. In Mirrlees-type frameworks, elasticities combined with information about the income distribution can be used to derive formulas for revenue-maximising and welfare-maximising marginal tax rates under stated assumptions. Because the elasticity depends on deductions, avoidance opportunities and enforcement, it is often treated as policy-dependent, motivating analysis of base broadening and anti-avoidance measures as complements to marginal-rate policy.

== See also ==
- Optimal tax
- Deadweight loss
- Laffer curve
- Effect of taxes on employment
