= Arthur Laffer =

American economist (born 1940)

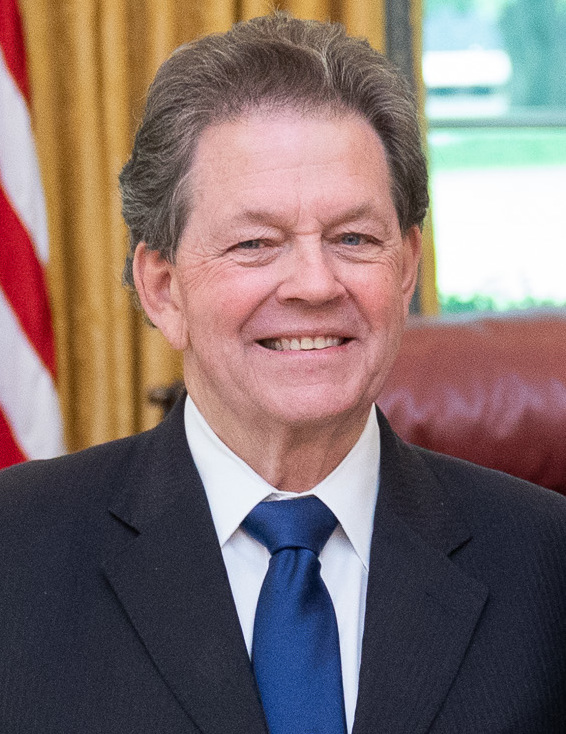
- Laffer at the White House in 2019
- Born: Arthur Betz Laffer; August 14, 1940 (age 86); Youngstown, Ohio, U.S.
- Relatives: Jonathan Lindsey (son-in-law)

Academic background
- Education: Yale University (BA); Stanford University (MBA, PhD)
- Doctoral advisor: Ronald McKinnon

Academic work
- Discipline: Political economics
- School or tradition: Supply-side economics
- Notable ideas: Laffer curve
- Awards: Presidential Medal of Freedom (2019)

Arthur Betz Laffer (/ˈlæfər/; born August 14, 1940) is an American economist and author who first gained prominence during the Ronald Reagan administration as a member of Reagan's Economic Policy Advisory Board (1981–1989). Laffer is best known for the Laffer curve, an illustration of the hypothesis that there exists a tax rate between 0% and 100% at which tax revenue for government will be maximised - suggesting that, in certain circumstances, governments could cut taxes, and simultaneously increase revenue and economic growth.

Laffer was an economic advisor to Donald Trump's 2016 presidential campaign. In 2019, President Trump awarded Laffer with the Presidential Medal of Freedom for his contributions in the field of economics.

== Early life and education ==
Laffer was born in Youngstown, Ohio, the son of Marian Amelia "Molly" (née Betz), a homemaker and politician, and William Gillespie Laffer, president of the Clevite Corporation. He was raised in the Cleveland, Ohio area. He is a Presbyterian, and was graduated from Cleveland's University School high school in 1958. Laffer earned a B.A. in economics from Yale University (1963) and an M.B.A. (1965) and a Ph.D. in economics (1972) from Stanford University.

== Academia ==
Laffer was an associate professor of Business Economics at the University of Chicago from 1970 to 1976 and a member of the Chicago faculty from 1967 through 1976. From 1976 to 1984 Laffer held the status as the Charles B. Thornton Professor of Business Economics at the University of Southern California School of Business. During this time Laffer helped pass Proposition 13, the California initiative that drastically cut property taxes in the state in 1978. In the mid-1980s, Laffer was the Distinguished University Professor at Pepperdine University in Malibu, and a member of the Pepperdine University Board of Directors.

== Politics ==
Laffer was the first to hold the title of chief economist at the Office of Management and Budget (OMB) under George Shultz from October 1970 to July 1972. During the years 1972 to 1977, he was a consultant to Secretary of the Treasury William Simon, Secretary of Defense Donald Rumsfeld and Secretary of the Treasury George Shultz.

Laffer was a member of President Ronald Reagan's Economic Policy Advisory Board for both of his terms (1981–1989) and was a founding member of the Reagan Executive Advisory Committee for the presidential race of 1980. He served as a member of the executive committee of the Reagan/Bush Finance Committee in 1984.

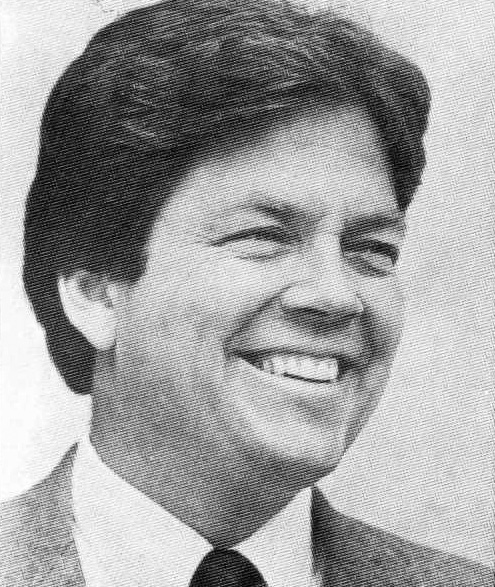
Laffer in 1988, during which he was part of the Economic Policy Advisory Board

In 1986, Laffer was a candidate for the Republican nomination for the U.S. Senate—which he lost in the California primary to U.S. Congressman Ed Zschau, who lost in the general election to the incumbent, Democrat Alan Cranston. Laffer identifies himself as a staunch fiscal conservative. However, he has stated publicly that he voted for President Bill Clinton in 1992 and 1996. He references President Clinton's conservative fiscal and unregulated market policies as cornerstones of his support.

In 2018, Laffer wrote the book Trumponomics with conservative economic commentator Stephen Moore, wherein they lauded the Trump administration's economic policies. In the book, Moore and Laffer argue that the Trump administration's 2017 tax plan would raise growth rates to as much as 6% and not increase budget deficits. In a 2019 review of the book, Greg Mankiw, a conservative economics professor at Harvard University, characterized Laffer and Moore as "rah-rah partisans" who "do not build their analysis on the foundation of professional consensus or serious studies from peer-reviewed journals ... The Laffer curve is undeniable as a matter of economic theory. There is certainly some level of taxation at which cutting tax rates would be win–win. But few economists believe that tax rates in the United States have reached such heights in recent years; to the contrary, they are likely below the revenue-maximizing level." The one issue where Moore and Laffer disagree with Trump is on the issue of free trade, which the duo supports. Previously, in 2016, Laffer said that he believed that then-candidate Trump was "going to be okay on trade" and lauded Trump's understanding of trade.

Laffer regularly writes opinion articles in The Wall Street Journal and The Washington Times.

On April 15, 2019, Laffer blamed the Great Recession on Barack Obama, "who I believe was the reason why we had the Great Recession. As he got closer and closer to winning the markets collapsed."

In 2020, Laffer advised the Trump administration on how to re-open the economy during the COVID-19 pandemic. Laffer argued for halting stimulus, calling instead for payroll tax cuts. He advocated for taxes on non-profit organizations in education and the arts, as well as for salary reductions for professors and government officials. He argued against expansion of unemployment aid, arguing it discouraged people from working.

=== Presidential Medal of Freedom ===
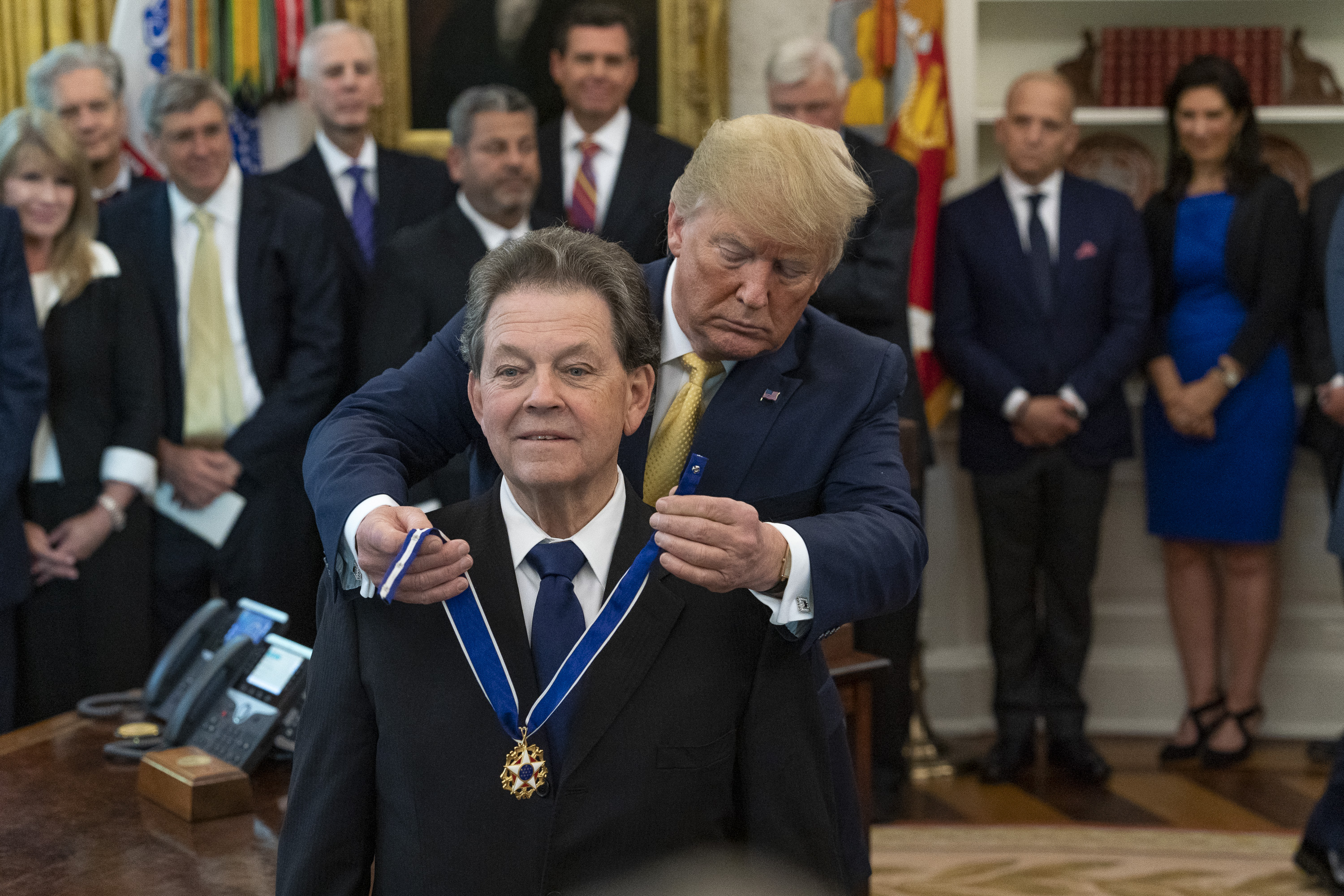
Laffer receives the Presidential Medal of Freedom from President Donald Trump in 2019.

In 2019, President Donald Trump awarded Laffer the Presidential Medal of Freedom, the nation's highest civilian honor. The Trump White House said Laffer was receiving the award for "public service and contributions to economic policy that have helped spur prosperity for our Nation" and that he was "one of the most influential economists in American history" due to popularizing the "Laffer curve". Trump praised Laffer for policies that he said brought "greater opportunity for all Americans."

== Laffer curve ==
A basic representation of a Laffer curve, plotting government revenue (R) against the tax rate (t) and showing the maximum revenue at t*

Although Laffer does not claim to have invented the Laffer curve concept, it was popularized with policymakers following an afternoon meeting Laffer had with Nixon/Ford Administration officials Dick Cheney and Donald Rumsfeld in 1974 in which he reportedly sketched the curve on a napkin to illustrate his argument. The term "Laffer curve" was coined by Jude Wanniski, who was also present. The basic concept was not new; Laffer himself says he learned it from Ibn Khaldun and John Maynard Keynes.

The Laffer curve is an economic hypothesis that shows the relationship between tax rates and the amount of tax revenue collected by governments. The Laffer curve shows that there is a certain point between 0% and 100% where tax revenues are maximized. The curve suggests that starting from zero, an increase in tax rates will increase the government's tax revenue; after a certain point, however, continuing to increase tax rates will cause a decrease in tax revenue. This decrease in tax revenue can be explained by decreased incentives for work and production. Laffer's postulate was that the tax rate that maximizes revenue was at a much lower level than previously believed: so low that current tax rates were above the level where revenue is maximized. While many economists believe that government spending to stimulate demand for products should be the solution for a poorly performing economy, Laffer argues that heavy taxes and regulation impede production, and therefore, government revenue.

Numerous leading economists have rejected the view that a tax rate cut of current federal U.S. income taxes can lead to increased tax revenue. When asked in a 2012 University of Chicago business school survey whether a "cut in federal income tax rates in the US right now would raise taxable income enough so that the annual total tax revenue would be higher within five years than without the tax cut", none of the economists surveyed agreed and 71% disagreed. According to Greg Mankiw, most economists have been very skeptical of Laffer's contention that decreases in tax rates could increase tax revenue, at least in the United States. In his textbook, Mankiw states, "there was little evidence for Laffer's view that U.S. tax rates had in fact reached such extreme levels." Under the direction of conservative economist Douglas Holtz-Eakin, the Congressional Budget Office conducted a 2005 study on the fiscal effects of a 10% cut in federal income tax rates, finding that it resulted in a significant net revenue loss. Economist John Quiggin distinguishes between the Laffer curve and Laffer's analysis of tax rates, writing that the Laffer curve was "correct but unoriginal" and that Laffer's analysis that the United States was on the wrong side of the Laffer curve "was original but incorrect."

Laffer was an economic adviser to Kansas Governor Sam Brownback, who in 2012 zeroed out state tax liability for approximately 330,000 of the top wage earners in the state, called the Kansas experiment, contending it would be a "shot of adrenaline into the heart of the Kansas economy." Laffer was paid $75,000 to advise in the creation of Brownback's tax cut plan, and gave Brownback his full endorsement, stating that what Brownback was doing was "truly revolutionary" and would bring "enormous prosperity" to Kansas. The state, which had previously had a budget surplus, experienced a budget deficit of about $200 million in 2012. Drastic cuts to state funding for education and infrastructure were implemented to close budget deficits and the Kansas economy underperformed relative to neighboring states. Brownback's tax overhaul was described in a June 2017 article in The Atlantic as the United States' "most aggressive experiment in conservative economic policy". The drastic tax cuts had "threatened the viability of schools and infrastructure" in Kansas. A supermajority of lawmakers in the Kansas legislature, both Democrats and Republicans, repealed the tax cut in June 2017, overriding Brownback's veto.

== Awards and recognition ==
Awards that Laffer has received for his economic work:

- 2 Graham and Dodd Awards from the Financial Analyst Federation for outstanding feature articles published in the Financial Analysts Journal
- The Distinguished Service Award by the National Association of Investment Clubs
- The Daniel Webster Award for public speaking by the International Platform Association
- Distinguished University Professor of Economics from Mercer University in 2008
- His book The End of Prosperity: How Higher Taxes Will Doom the Economy-If We Let it Happen was nominated for the F.A. Hayek Book Award in 2009
- The Hayek Lifetime Achievement Award in 2016
- In December 2017, Laffer became the first recipient of the American Legislative Exchange Council's Laffer Award for Economic Excellence
- Laffer was awarded the Presidential Medal of Freedom by President Donald Trump on June 19, 2019.

Laffer has been widely acknowledged for his economic influence, including:

- Listed in "A Gallery of the Greatest People Who Influenced Our Daily Business," in The Wall Street Journal on June 23, 1989
- Included in "A Dozen Who Shaped the '80s," in the Los Angeles Times on January 1, 1990
- His creation of the Laffer Curve was deemed a "memorable event" in financial history by the Institutional Investor in its July 1992 Silver Anniversary issue, "The Heroes, Villains, Triumphs, Failures, and Other Memorable Events."
- Noted in Time magazine's March 29, 1999 cover story, "A Century of Science" for "his supply-side economic theories, which hold that reducing federal taxes spurs economic growth and, eventually, increases federal revenues"
- Bloomberg Businessweek selected the Laffer Curve as one of the "85 Most Disruptive Ideas In Our History" for its 85th anniversary issue in 2014. Bloomberg produced a video with Laffer, Dick Cheney and Donald Rumsfeld about the Laffer Curve and the "dinner napkin that changed the economy"

== Publications ==
The following is a partial list of publications written primarily by Laffer, with co-authors indicated, in order by date:

- “International Short-Term Capital Movements: Comments,” The American Economic Review 57 (3), pp. 548–565 (1967)
- “The Economics of Cycles and Growth,” written by Stanley Bober, reviewed by Arthur Laffer, The American Economic Review 58 (4), pp. 1006–1007 (1968)
- "The U.S. Balance of Payments – A Financial Center View," Law and Contemporary Problems 34 (1), pp. 33–46 (1969).
- "Vertical Integration by Corporations, 1929–1965," Review of Economics and Statistics 51 (1), pp. 91–93 (1969).
- "Trade Credit and the Money Market," J. Political Economy 78 (2), 239–267 (1970).
- "Information and Capital Markets", (with Eugene Fama). J. Business 44 (3), pp. 289–298 (1971).
- "A Formal Model of the Economy," (with R. David Ranson). J. Business 44 (3), pp. 247–270 (1971).
- "The Number of Firms and Competition", (with Eugene F. Fama). American Economic Review 62 (4), pp. 670–674 (1972).
- "Monetary Policy and the Balance of Payments," J. Money, Credit, and Banking Part I 4 (1), 13–22 (1972).
- "Some Evidence on the Formation, Efficiency and Accuracy of Anticipations of Nominal Yields," (with Richard Zecher). J. Monetary Economics 1 (3), pp. 327–342 (1975).
- The Phenomenon of Worldwide Inflation, co-edited with David Meiselman, American Enterprise Institute, Washington, D.C., 1975.
- The Economics of the Tax Revolt: A Reader, co-authored with Jan P. Seymour, Harcourt Brace Jovanovich, Inc., San Diego, 1976.
- De Fiscus Onder Het Mes, Uitgeverij Acropolis, Brussel/Amstelveen, 1981.
- L’Ellipse ou la Loi des Rendements Fiscaux Decroissants, Institutum Europaeum, Brussels, 1981
- Future American Energy Policy, co-authored with Meredith S. Crist, Lexington Books, Lexington, Massachusetts, 1982.
- "Reinstatement of the Dollar: The Blueprint," Economic Notes 0 (2), pp. 158–176 (1982).
- Victor A. Canto, Douglas H. Joines, and Arthur B. Laffer, Foundations of Supply-Side Economics – Theory and Evidence (New York: Academic Press, 1982).
- "A High Road for the American Automobile Industry," World Economy 8 (3), pp. 267–286 (1985).
- "The Ellipse: An Explication of the Laffer Curve in a Two-Factor Model," The Financial Analyst's Guide to Fiscal Policy, pp. 1–35 (New York: Greenwood Press, 1986).
- "Heightened foreign competition only route for American prosperity," The Journal Record (June 9, 1987).
- "America in the World Economy: A Strategy for the 1990s: Commentary," America's Global Interests: A New Agenda, pp. 122–125 (London: Norton, 1989).
- Monetary Policy, Taxation, and International Investment Strategy, co-edited with Victor A. Canto, Quorum Books, Connecticut. 1990.
- "Either California's Housing Prices Are Going to Fall or California's in for One Helluva Rise in Personal Income," (with Christopher S. Hammond). Investment Strategy and State and Local Economic Policy, pp. 49–64 (London: Quorum Books, 1992).
- Investment Strategy and State and Local Economic Policy, co-authored with Victor A. Canto and Robert I. Webb, Quorum Books, Connecticut. 1992.
- "Trading Policy Outlook," Industrial Policy and International Trade, pp. 175–186, Volume 62 in Contemporary Studies in Economic and Financial Analysis (London: JAI Press, 1992).
- "The Reagan-Clinton Presidency," International Economy 12 (2), 22–24 (1998).
- "Bullish on Japan," (with Thomas J. Martin). American Spectator pp. 28–30 (June 1, 2001).
- "The Laffer Curve: Past, Present, and Future^{[unfit]}," Heritage Foundation Backgrounder #1765 (June 1, 2004).
- Rich States, Poor States: ALEC-Laffer State Economic Competitiveness Index, co-authored with Stephen Moore and Jonathan Williams, American Legislative Exchange Council, 1st Edition 2008, 2nd Edition 2009, 3rd Edition 2010, 4th Edition 2011, 5th Edition 2012, 6th Edition 2013, 7th Edition 2014, 8th Edition 2015, 9th Edition 2016, 10th Edition 2017.
- "The Prognosis for National Health Insurance: A Colorado Perspective, Independence Institute (August 2009)
- (with Stephen Moore and Peter Tanous) (September 8, 2009). The End of Prosperity: How Higher Taxes Will Doom the Economy--If We Let It Happen. Simon and Schuster. ISBN 978-1-4165-9239-6.
- The Private Equity Edge: How Private Equity Players and the World’s Top Companies Build Value and Wealth, co-authored with William J. Hass and Shepherd G. Pryor IV, McGraw-Hill, New York, 2009.
- Return to Prosperity: How America Can Regain its Economic Superpower Status, co-authored with Stephen Moore, Threshold Editions, New York, 2010.
- Eureka!: How to Fix California, with Wayne Winegarden, Ph.D. Pacific Research Institute, San Francisco, 2012
- An Inquiry into the Nature and Causes of the Wealth of States, co-authored with Stephen Moore, Rex A. Sinquefield, and Travis Brown, John Wiley and Sons, Inc., New Jersey, 2014.
- The Pillars of Reaganomics: A Generation of Wisdom from Arthur Laffer and the Supply-Side Revolutionaries, edited by Brian Domitrovic, The Laffer Center at the Pacific Research Institute, San Francisco, 2014.
- Handbook of Tobacco Taxation, The Laffer Center at the Pacific Research Institute, San Francisco, 2014.
- Wealth of States: More Ways to Enhance Freedom, Opportunity and Growth, co-authored with Stephen Moore, Rex A. Sinquefield, and Travis Brown, 2017.
- Trumponomics: Inside the America First Plan to Revive Our Economy. (with Stephen Moore). All Points Books, 2018 ISBN 9781250193711
- Taxes Have Consequences: An Income Tax History of the United States. co-authored with Brian Domitrovic, Jeanne Cairns Sinquefield, Donald Trump (Foreword). Post Hill Press, 2022
- The Trump Economic Miracle, with Stephen Moore (Post Hill Press, 2024). The book is about restoring America's prosperity based on pro-business policy ideas, arguing that Donald Trump's pro-growth policies "fueled unprecedented growth and prosperity".

Laffer has written two children's books with Michelle A. Balconi: "Let’s Chat About Economics" (2014) and "Let’s Chat About Democracy" (2017).

== See also ==
- Supply-side economics
- Trickle-down economics
