= IHS Press =

Publisher in Virginia, United States

IHS Press is a publishing house based in Virginia whose purpose is to re-popularize the works of Catholic Social Thought by Catholic authors of the early 20th century.

The name "IHS" is a truncation of the first three letters of the Greek name of Jesus Christ. IHS Press has been concerned with the promotion of the social teaching as laid down by former Pope Leo XIII in his encyclical Rerum novarum. It has focused on reprinting works of authors who promote a third-way between capitalism and socialism such as G. K. Chesterton and Hilaire Belloc, along with those of such older guild theorists as Arthur Penty and Heinrich Pesch.

IHS Press is chaired by John Sharpe. Sharpe was the public affairs officer for the USS Carl Vinson, an aircraft carrier, when the Navy investigated him in 2007 after reports of antisemitic activities, according to the SPLC. The Navy reassigned him and reprimanded him for criticisms of President George W. Bush and the Iraq War in IHS books he had edited, but not for antisemitism, according to the SPLC. The SPLC said Sharpe also ran another hate group, the Legion of St. Louis, and was on the board of the St. George Educational Trust, described as a radical British Catholic group.

In 2005, IHS Press launched an imprint, Light in the Darkness Publications (LID), which published Neo-Conned!, a two volume compendium of essays opposing the Iraq War.
