= Index of economics articles =

This aims to be a complete article list of economics topics:

== A ==
- Absence rate – Accountancy – Accounting reform – Actuary – Adaptive expectations – Adverse selection – Agent (economics) – Agent-based computational economics – Aggregate demand – Aggregate supply – Agricultural policy – Appropriate technology – Arbitrage – Arrow's impossibility theorem – Asymmetric information – Auction – Austrian School – Autarky – Awards

== B ==
- Backward induction – Balance of payments – Balance of trade – Bank – Bank reserves – Bankruptcy – Barter – Behavioral economics – Bellman equation – Bequest motive – Big Mac Index – Big Push Model – Bioeconomics (biophysical) – Black market – Black–Scholes – Bretton Woods System – Bullionism – Business cycle – Bertrand–Edgeworth model

== C ==
- Capital (economics) – Capital asset – Capital intensity – Capitalism – Cartel – Cash crop – Catch-up effect – Celtic Tiger – Central bank – Ceteris paribus – Charity shop – Chicago School of Economics – Circular flow of income — Classical economics – Classical general equilibrium model – Coase conjecture – Coase theorem – Cobweb model – Collective action – Collusion – Commodity – Commodity market – Commodity money – Community-based economics – Comparative advantage – Comparative dynamics – Comparative statics – Compensating differential – Competition – Competition law – Complementary good – Complexity economics – Comprehensive Income Policy Agreement – Computational economics – Concentration ratio – Consumer – Consumer price index – Consumer sovereignty – Consumer surplus – Consumer theory – Consumerism – Consumption (economics) – Contestable market – Contract curve – Contract theory – Cooperative – Cost – Cost–benefit analysis – Cost curve – Cost-of-production theory of value – Cost overrun – Cost-push inflation – Cost underestimation – Cournot competition – Cross elasticity of demand – Cultural ecology – Currency – Cycle of poverty

== D ==
- Damages – Dead cat bounce – Deadweight loss – Debt – Decentralization – Deflation – Demand-pull inflation – Demurrage currency – Depreciation (currency) – Depreciation (economics) – Depression (economics) – Devaluation – Development economics – Differentiated Bertrand competition – Disequilibrium macroeconomics – Disinflation – Dispersed knowledge – Distribution (business) – Distribution (economics) – Distribution of income – Distribution of wealth – Dividend imputation – Division of labor – Dual-sector model – Duopoly – Dynamic programming – Dynamic stochastic general equilibrium

== E ==
- Ecological economics – Econometrics – Economic base analysis – Economic calculation problem – Economic development – Economic equilibrium – Economic geography – Economic graph – Economic growth – Economic history – Economic impact of immigration to Canada – Economic indicator – Economic model – Economic policy – Economic problem – Economic rent – Economic surplus – Economic system – Economic union – Economics – Economics terminology that differs from common usage – Economies of agglomeration – Economies of scale – Economies of scope – Economy of Canada – Ecotax – Edgeworth box – Edgeworth's limit theorem – Efficiency dividend – Efficiency wages – Efficient-market hypothesis – Elasticity (economics) – Elasticity of substitution – Electricity market – Employment – Endogenous growth theory – Energy economics – Entrepreneur – Entrepreneurial economics – Entrepreneurship – Environmental economics – Environmental finance – Equilibrium selection – Ethical consumerism – Euro – Event study – Evolutionary economics – Exceptionalism – Excess burden of taxation – Exogenous and endogenous variables – Exogenous growth model – Expected utility hypothesis – The Experience Economy – Experimental economics – Externality -Effective exchange rate

== F ==
- Factor price equalization – Factors of production – Fair trade – Feminist economics – Fiat money – Finance – Financial astrology – Financial capital – Financial econometrics – Financial economics – Financial instrument – Fiscal policy – Fisher equation – Fisher separation theorem – Forecasting – Fractional-reserve banking – Free good – Free-rider problem – Free trade – Freiwirtschaft – Friedman rule – Full-reserve banking

== G ==
- Game theory -Gandhian economics – General equilibrium – Geographical pricing – Georgism – Gerschenkron effect – Giffen good – Gini coefficient – Global game – Globalization – Gold standard – Good (economics) – Goodhart's law – Government debt – Government-granted monopoly – Gresham's law – Gross domestic product – Gross national product – Gross private domestic investment – Gross value added – Growth accounting - Green marketing

== H ==
- Happiness economics – Hard currency – Harris–Todaro model – Hauser's Law – Hedonic regression – Herfindahl index – Heterodox economics – Historical school of economics – History of economic thought – Home economics – Homo economicus – Hotelling's law – Human capital – Human Development Index – Human development theory – Human resources – Humanistic economics – Hyperinflation

== I ==
- Identity economics – Imperfect competition – Implied in fact contract – Import – Import substitution industrialization – Imputation (economics) – Incentive – Income – Income effect – Income elasticity of demand (YED) – Income inequality metrics – Income tax – Independent goods – Indifference curve – Indigo Era (economics) – Individual capital – Induced demand – Industrial organization – Industrial policy – Industrial Revolution – Industrialisation – Inferior good – Inflation – Inflation targeting – Informal sector – Information asymmetry – Information economics – Infrastructural capital – Input–output model – Institutional economics – Interest – Interest-free economy – Interest rate parity – International economics – international finance – International trade – International Year of Microcredit – Intertemporal choice – Intertemporal equilibrium – Investment – Investment (macroeconomics) – Investment policy – Investment specific technological progress – Invisible hand – Islamic economic jurisprudence – IS/LM model – Isoquant –Isovalue lines – Ithaca Hours

== J ==
- Jane Jacobs – JEL classification codes – Job hunting – Joint product pricing – Just price

== K ==
- Kaldor-Hicks efficiency – Keynesian economics – Keynesian formula – Knowledge economy

== L ==
- Labor theory of value – Labour economics – Labor union – Laffer curve – Laissez-faire – Land (economics) – Land value tax – Law and economics – Legal origins theory – Lerman ratio – Limit price – List of unsolved problems in economics – List of topics in industrial organization – Lemon market – Living wage – Local currency – Local purchasing – Lorenz curve – Low-carbon economy – Lucas critique – Luxury goods

== M ==
- Macroeconomics – Making-up price – Managerial economics – Marginal cost – Marginal rate of substitution – Marginal revenue – Marginal utility – Marginalism – Market – Market anomaly – Market concentration – Market economy – Market failure – Market for lemons – Market power – Market share – Market structure – Market system – Markup rule – Marxian economics – Mathematical economics – Means of production – Measures of national income and output – Mechanism (sociology) – Medium of exchange – Mental accounting – Menu cost – Mercantilism – Merger simulation – Methodenstreit – Methodological individualism – Microcredit – Microeconomics – Minimum wage – Missing market – Model (macroeconomics) – Modern portfolio theory – Modigliani–Miller theorem – Monetarism – Monetary economics – Monetary policy – Monetary reform – Monetary system – Money – Money creation – Money multiplier – Money supply – Monopoly – Monopoly profit – Monopsony – Moral hazard

== N ==
- NAIRU – Nakamura number – Nanoeconomics – Nash equilibrium – National Income and Product Accounts – Natural capital – Natural Capitalism – Natural monopoly – Natural resource economics – Neoclassical economics – Neo-Keynesian economics – Neoliberalism – Net investment – Network effect – Neuroeconomics – New classical macroeconomics – New Keynesian economics – Nobel Memorial Prize in Economic Sciences – Normal good - Nominal effective exchange rate

== O ==
- Occupational licensing - Okun's law – Oligopoly – Oligopsony – Operations research – Opportunity cost – Ordinary least squares – Output (economics) – Overhead (business)

== P ==
- Pacman conjecture – Parable of the broken window – Pareto efficiency – Participatory economics – Peltzman effect – Perfect competition – Perspectives on Capitalism – Petrocurrency – Phillips curve – Pigovian tax – Platform imperialism – Pluralism in economics – Policy-ineffectiveness proposition – Political economy – Potential output – Poverty – Poverty threshold – Preference – Price control – Price discrimination – Price elasticity of demand – Price point – Price specie flow mechanism – Principal–agent problem – Principles of Economics – Prisoner's dilemma – Product bundling – Production function – Production-possibility frontier – Production theory basics – Productivism – Productivity – Profit (economics) – Profit maximization – Property rights (economics) – Prospect theory – Public choice theory – Public bad – Public good – Purchasing power parity

== Q ==
- Quality of life – Quasi-market – Quantitative easing – Quantity theory of money

== R ==
- Rate of return pricing – Rational choice theory – Rational expectations – Rational pricing – Reaganomics – Real business-cycle theory – Real estate economics – Real estate investor – Real versus nominal value (economics) – Recession – Regenerative economic theory – Regional economics – Regression analysis – Remanufacturing – Rent control – Representative agent – Repugnancy costs – Reserve currency – Ricardian equivalence – Risk premium – Risk-free bond – Risk-free interest rate – Road pricing – Robin Hood effect - Real sectors

== S ==
- Safe trade – Sales tax – Saving – Scan-back allowance – Scarcity – Search theory – Self-revelation – Seven generation sustainability – Shock therapy (economics) – Signalling (economics) – Singer-Prebisch thesis – Slavery – Social capital – Social cost – Social Credit – Social finance – Social mobility – Social welfare function – Social welfare provision – Socialism – Socialist economics – Socioeconomics – Specialization (functional) – Spending multiplier – Stagflation – Standard of deferred payment – Standard of living – Stock exchange – Store of value – Strategic complements – Subgame perfect equilibrium – Subjective theory of value – Subsidy – Subsistence agriculture – Substitute good – Substitution effect – Sunk costs – Sunspot equilibrium – Sunspots (economics) – Supermodular function – Supply and demand – Supply-side economics – Surplus value – Sustainable development – Sweatshop

== T ==
- Tariff – Tax – Tax, tariff and trade – Taylor rule – Technostructure – Terms of trade – Theory of the firm – Time-based currency – Time preference – Total cost of ownership – Trade – Trade bloc – Trade facilitation – Trade pact – Tragedy of the anticommons – Tragedy of the commons – Transaction cost – Transfer payment – Transfer pricing – Transformation problem – Transparency (market) – Transport economics – Triple bottom line – Trust (social sciences) – Two-part tariff – Tying (commerce)

== U ==
- Underground economy – Uneconomic growth – Unemployment – Unionization – Unit of account – United States public debt – Universe (economics) – Urban economics – Utilitarianism – Utility – Utility maximization problem

== V ==
- Value (economics) – Value added – Value added tax – Value of life – Veblen good – Velocity of money – Virtuous circle and vicious circle – von Neumann-Morgenstern utility function

== W ==
- Wage – Wealth – Wealth effect – Welfare – Welfare economics – Welfare trap – Workers' self-management

== X ==
- X-efficiency

== Y ==
- Yield (finance) – YOYO economics

== Z ==
- Zero-sum

== See also ==
- Economics
- Glossary of economics
- List of accounting topics
- List of business law topics
- List of business theorists
- List of community topics
- List of economic communities
- List of economic reports by U.S. government agencies
- List of free trade agreements
- List of international trade topics
- List of management topics
- List of marketing topics
- List of production functions
- List of production topics
- List of recessions in the United States
- List of scholarly journals in economics
- List of topics in industrial organization
