= Net (economics) =

Resultant amount after accounting for the sum or difference of two or more variables

A net (sometimes written nett) value is the resultant amount after accounting for the sum or difference of two or more variables.

In economics, it is frequently used to imply the remaining value after accounting for a specific, commonly understood deduction. In these cases it is contrasted with the term gross, which refers to the pre-deduction value. For example, net income is the total income of a company after deducting its expenses—commonly known as profit—or the total income of an individual after deducting their income tax. Profit may be broken down further into pre-taxed or gross profit and profit after taxes or net profit. Similarly, an individual's net worth is the difference between their assets (what they own) and their liabilities (what they owe to others).

Similarly, net investment in physical capital such as machinery equals gross (total) investment minus the dollar amount of replacement investment that offsets depreciation of pre-existing machinery, thus giving the change in the amount of machinery available for use. Likewise, net national product equals gross national product minus depreciation.

== Etymology ==
The word net, in this sense, originally derives from the Latin nitere (to shine) and nitidus (elegant, trim), and more recently from the French net (sharp, neat, clean).

== Grammatical usage ==
In this sense, it may appear, separated by a comma, following the noun it modifies, e.g., "earned two million dollars, net".

== See also ==
- Net metering, electricity policy
- Net 30, form of trade credit
- Net profit, gross profit minus overhead and interest
- Net weight, weight of a product, not counting packaging
- Net pay, salary after deductions
- Net operating loss
- Present value
