= Depreciation (economics) =

Concept in economics

In economics, depreciation is the gradual decrease in the economic value of the capital stock of a firm, nation or other entity, either through physical depreciation, obsolescence or changes in the demand for the services of the capital in question. If the capital stock is $K_t$ in one period $t$, gross (total) investment spending on newly produced capital is $I_t$ and depreciation is $D_t$, the capital stock in the next period, $K_{t+1}$, is $K_t + I_t - D_t$. The net increment to the capital stock is the difference between gross investment and depreciation, and is called net investment.

== Models ==
In economics, the value of a capital asset may be modeled as the present value of the flow of services the asset will generate in future, appropriately adjusted for uncertainty. Economic depreciation over a given period is the reduction in the remaining value of future goods and services.

Under certain circumstances, such as an unanticipated increase in the price of the services generated by an asset or a reduction in the discount rate, its value may increase rather than decline. Depreciation is then negative.

Depreciation can alternatively be measured as the change in the market value of capital over a given period: the market price of the capital at the beginning of the period minus its market price at the end of the period.

Such a method in calculating depreciation differs from other methods, such as straight-line depreciation in that it is included in the calculation of implicit cost, and thus economic profit.

Modeling depreciation of a durable as delivering the same services from purchase until failure, with zero scrap value (rather than slowing degrading and retaining residual value), is referred to as the light bulb model of depreciation, or more colorfully as the one-hoss shay model, after a poem by Oliver Wendell Holmes Sr., about a carriage which worked perfectly for exactly one hundred years, then fell completely apart in an instant.

== National accounts ==
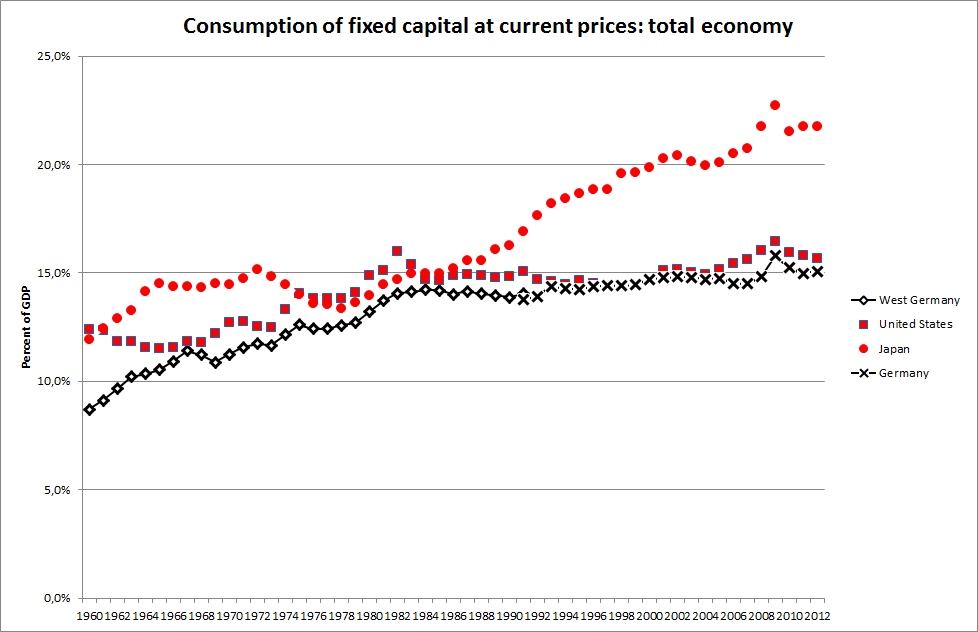
Consumption of fixed capital in percent of GDP, Germany, Japan, United States, computed from data of Ameco data base.

In national accounts the decline in the aggregate capital stock arising from the use of fixed assets in production is referred to as consumption of fixed capital (CFC). Hence, CFC is equal to the difference between aggregate gross fixed capital formation (gross investment) and net fixed capital formation (net investment) or between Gross National Product and Net National Product. Unlike depreciation in business accounting, CFC in national accounts is, in principle, not a method of allocating the costs of past expenditures on fixed assets over subsequent accounting periods. Rather, fixed assets at a given moment in time are valued according to the remaining benefits to be derived from their use.

== See also ==
- Amortization (accounting)
