= Flypaper effect =

Grant municipality increase level of public spending more than income of equivalent size

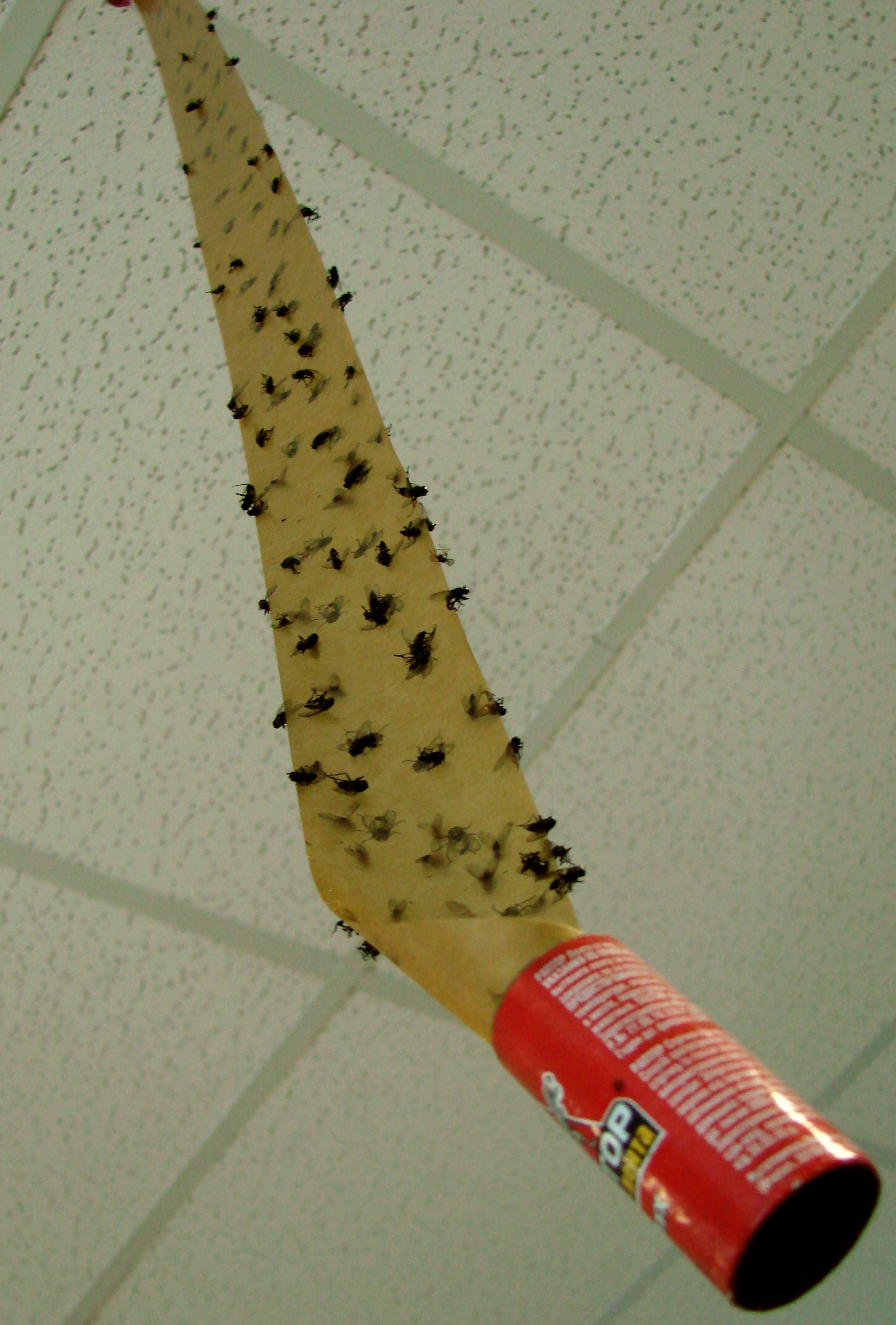
The flypaper effect is named after flypaper.

The flypaper effect is a concept from the field of public finance that suggests that a government grant to a recipient municipality increases the level of local public spending more than an increase in local income of an equivalent size. When a dollar of exogenous grants to a community leads to significantly greater public spending than an equivalent dollar of citizen income: money sticks where it hits, like a fly to flypaper. Grants to the government will stay in the hands of the government and income to individuals will stay with these individuals.

== Founding ==
The concept was first described in a metaphorical way by Arthur Okun in response to the research of his colleague Edward Gramlich, which was published in 1979 as The Stimulative Effects of Intergovernmental Grants. Gramlich, together with Courant and Rubinfeld, sought an explanation for the phenomenon that nonmatching grants stimulate much more local spending per dollar of grant than does income going to private citizens within the community. The flypaper effect in this paper is defined as: "bureaucrats and politicians find it easier to avoid cutting taxes when the government receives revenue-sharing monies than they do to raise taxes when some exogenous event raises the income of the community."

In this case, the finding was that a grant from federal government to local government would raise spending of that local government by a greater amount than an equivalent increase in local income. Local public resources come from both fiscal transfers from the central government in the form of grants and from the income of individuals. Henderson and Gramlich specified the demand equations of individuals by maximizing their utility subject to that individual's income constraint, which is specified as the sum of personal income and the individual's share of his government's unconstrained fiscal transfers. This specification would mean that the individual income and the individual's share of the fiscal transfers would have an identical impact on spending. The Flypaper effect however suggests that this is not the case. This can be described as an anomaly since it is difficult to rationalize: one would expect that a government grant and an equivalent increase in local income to have the same effect.

== Explanation ==
A common explanation of the flypaper effect has a focus on the role of public officials. It was first argued by William Niskanen that public officials tend to maximize their budgets by the budget-maximizing model. As public officials are budget maximizers, the bureaucrats have no incentive to inform citizens about the true level of grant funding that a community receives. If public officials conceal this information, they may trick citizens into voting for a higher level of funding than would have otherwise been the case. In this respect, the flypaper effect occurs because citizens are unaware of the true budget constraint.

Other explanations offered are that it could be a data-problem or an econometric problem. It is possible that matching grants have been noted as non-matching grants in statistical data or that there is some omitted variable bias present.

== Empirical evidence ==
Ever since the flypaper effect was first suggested multiple researchers have tried to establish empirical evidence for the phenomenon. Most studies find that indeed that a dollar received by the community in the form of a grant results in greater public spending than a dollar increase in community income.

The original research performed by Courant, Gramlich and Rubinfeld was the first study to find an empirical result that would support the flypaper effect. Later research found that not all non-matching grants are perceived by the community which would therefore support the flypaper effect.

A study by Fafchamps, McKenzie, Quinn and Woodruff (2014) demonstrates the flypaper effect using a randomized trial in Ghana, comparing cash transfers to in-kind transfers.

== See also ==
- Fiscal illusion
- Fiscal incidence
