= West One Bridging Index =

The West One Bridging Index (WOBI) is a collection of data intended to measure the state of the UK bridging market. Bridging is in effect a short-term loan designed to help a borrower obtain immediate funding to begin a particular project. In most cases, this loan is repaid once a longer term financial solution is put in place. The UK bridging loan market is currently unregulated by the Financial Services Authority (FSA), and as a consequence the Government does not produce any official statistics on the bridging industry.

== History ==
The West One Bridging Index was launched in 2011 by West One Loans.

== Index Source Material ==
The West One Bridging Index is calculated and published every two months (six editions per year), and consists of gross and net lending figures, number of loans (calculated on a 3-month moving average), average loan sizes, 1st charge loan to value (LTV), monthly interest rate fluctuations, and market predictions. It uses West One Loans’ management data, as well as statistics published by the Association of Bridging Professionals (AOBP) and other leading UK bridging loan lenders.
