= Swedish Fiscal Policy Council =

The Swedish Fiscal Policy Council (Swedish: Finanspolitiska rådet) is a Swedish government agency organized under the Ministry of Finance tasked with providing an independent evaluation of the Government's fiscal policy. It was established in Stockholm 2007, to review and assess the extent to which the fiscal and economic policy objectives decided on by the Riksdag are being met. Objectives include long-term sustainability of public finances and economic growth, maintaining a target surplus, staying below the expenditure ceiling set by the Riksdag, and a consistent fiscal policy. The Council also promote a public debate on economic policy, and evaluate economic forecasts on which economic assessments by the Government are based. This is primarily done with the annual publication of a report, through conferences, and studies on the Swedish fiscal policy.

== Annual report ==
The Council publishes an annual independent evaluation of the Government's fiscal policy, presented to the Minister for Finance. It's available on-line in English.

== See also ==
Similar agencies and organizations in other countries:

- Federal Planning Bureau - Belgium
- Parliamentary Budget Officer - Canada
- German Council of Economic Experts - Germany
- Bureau for Economic Policy Analysis - Netherlands
- Korean National Assembly Budget Office - South Korea
- Office for Budget Responsibility - United Kingdom
- Congressional Budget Office - USA
