= Last look (foreign exchange) =

Foreign exchange market

Last look is a trading practice where the liquidity provider (LP) provides a quote rather than a firm price into the trading system or execution venue. Last look venues are often used to conduct trading on foreign exchange markets (FX) for retail foreign exchange trading.

== Procedure ==
When a request to trade against the quoted price is received, the LP may hold the request for some time, execute the trade (fill) at the price quoted, offer an alternative price (requote) or decline to trade (reject). Firm liquidity venues on the other hand operate an open central limit order book where trades are matched without optionality. Last look's quote-driven behaviour is commonly argued to be necessary to protect the liquidity providers in a fragmented and unregulated market place where there is no central exchange.

== Regulation ==
The last look model has been the subject of several recent investigations and fines for misconduct over abuses of the practice and lack of transparency.

Regulators are showing increased interest in the provision of last look liquidity in the FX market, with the Bank of England conducting a 'Fair and Effective Markets Review' (FEMR) which included recommendations for the FX industry. In response, the FX industry has moved towards adopting a global code of conduct. However surveys indicate that many FX market participants do not believe that the situation has improved in the last two years.

== Cost analysis ==
Both industry comment and the FEMR review final report describe the use of transaction cost analysis (TCA) as a method by which buy side traders can assess quality of execution from all liquidity providers and determine if they are at a disadvantage from last look.
