= Opportunity cost =

Benefit lost by a choice between options

In microeconomic theory, the opportunity cost of a choice is the value of the best alternative forgone where, given limited resources, a choice needs to be made between several mutually exclusive alternatives. Assuming the best choice is made, it is the "cost" incurred by not enjoying the benefit that would have been had if the second best available choice had been taken instead. The New Oxford American Dictionary defines it as "the loss of potential gain from other alternatives when one alternative is chosen". As a representation of the relationship between scarcity and choice, the objective of opportunity cost is to ensure efficient use of scarce resources. It incorporates all associated costs of a decision, both explicit and implicit. Thus, opportunity costs are not restricted to monetary or financial costs: the real cost of output forgone, lost time, pleasure, or any other benefit that provides utility should also be considered an opportunity cost.

== Types ==
=== Explicit costs ===
Explicit costs are the direct costs of an action (business operating costs or expenses), executed through either a cash transaction or a physical transfer of resources. In other words, explicit opportunity costs are the out-of-pocket costs of a firm, that are easily identifiable. This means explicit costs will always have a dollar value and involve a transfer of money, e.g. paying employees. With this said, these particular costs can easily be identified under the expenses of a firm's income statement and balance sheet to represent all the cash outflows of a firm.

Examples include:

- Land and infrastructure costs
- Operation and maintenance costs—wages, rent, overhead, materials

Potential scenarios include:

- If a person leaves work for an hour and spends $200 on office supplies, then the explicit costs for the individual equates to the total expenses for the office supplies of $200.
- If a company's printer malfunctions, then the explicit costs for the company equates to the total amount to be paid to the repair technician.

=== Implicit costs ===
Implicit costs (also referred to as implied, imputed or notional costs) are the opportunity costs of utilising resources owned by the firm that could be used for other purposes. These costs are often hidden to the naked eye and are not made known. Unlike explicit costs, implicit opportunity costs correspond to intangibles. Hence, they cannot be clearly identified, defined or reported. This means that they are costs that have already occurred within a project, without exchanging cash. This could include a small business owner not taking any salary in the beginning of their tenure as a way for the business to be more profitable. As implicit costs are the result of assets, they are also not recorded for the use of accounting purposes because they do not represent any monetary losses or gains. In terms of factors of production, implicit opportunity costs allow for depreciation of goods, materials and equipment that ensure the operations of a company.

Examples of implicit costs regarding production are mainly resources contributed by a business owner. These include:

- Human labour
- Infrastructure
- Risk
- Time spent: also involves considering other valuable activities that could have been undertaken in order to maximize the return on time invested

Some potential scenarios are:

- If a person leaves work for an hour to spend $200 on office supplies, and has an hourly rate of $25, then the implicit costs for the individual equates to the $25 that they could have earned instead.
- If a company's printer malfunctions, the implicit cost equates to the total production time that could have been utilized if the machine did not break down.

== Excluded from opportunity cost ==
=== Sunk costs ===
Sunk costs (also referred to as historical costs) are costs that have been incurred already and cannot be recovered. As sunk costs have already been incurred, they remain unchanged and should not influence present or future actions or decisions regarding benefits and costs.

=== Marginal cost ===
The concept of marginal cost in economics is the incremental cost of each new product produced for the entire product line. For example, building a single aircraft costs a lot of money, but when building a hundred, the cost of the 100th will be much lower. When building a new aircraft, the materials used could have been put to other uses, such as building additional aircraft, so make as many aircraft as possible from as few materials as possible to increase the margin of profit. Marginal cost is abbreviated MC or MPC.

The increase in cost caused by an additional unit of production is called marginal cost. By definition, marginal cost (MC) is equal to the change in total cost (△TC) divided by the corresponding change in output (△Q): MC(Q) = △TC(Q)/△Q or, taking the limit as △Q goes to zero,

${MC(Q) = \lim_{\Delta Q\to 0}{\frac{\Delta TC(Q)}{\Delta Q} }= \frac{dTC}{dQ}. }$

In theory marginal costs represent the increase in total costs (which include both constant and variable costs) as output increases by 1 unit.

=== Adjustment cost ===
The phrase "adjustment costs" gained significance in macroeconomic studies, referring to the expenses a company bears when altering its production levels in response to fluctuations in demand and input costs. These costs may encompass those related to acquiring, setting up, and mastering new capital equipment, as well as costs tied to hiring, dismissing, and training employees to modify production.

"Adjustment costs" describe shifts in the firm's product nature rather than merely changes in output volume. The notion of adjustment costs is expanded in this manner because, to reposition itself in the market relative to rivals, a company usually needs to alter crucial features of its goods or services to enhance competition based on differentiation or cost. In line with the conventional concept, the adjustment costs experienced during repositioning may involve expenses linked to the reassignment of capital and/or labor resources. However, they might also include costs from other areas, such as changes in organizational abilities, assets, and expertise.

== Uses ==
=== Economic profit versus accounting profit ===
The main objective of accounting profits is to give an account of a company's fiscal performance, typically reported on quarterly and annually. As such, accounting principles focus on tangible and measurable factors associated with operating a business such as wages and rent, and thus, do not "infer anything about relative economic profitability". Opportunity costs are not considered in accounting profits as they have no purpose in this regard.

The purpose of calculating economic profits, and thus opportunity costs, is to aid in better business decision-making through the inclusion of opportunity costs. In this way, a business can evaluate whether its decision and the allocation of its resources is cost-effective or not and whether resources should be reallocated.

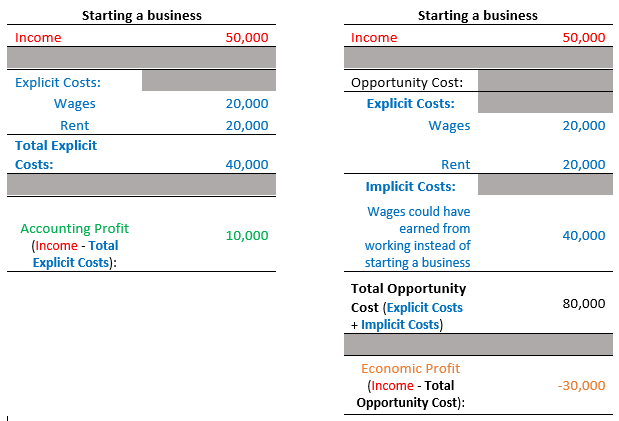
Simplified example of comparing economic profit vs accounting profit

Economic profit does not indicate whether or not a business decision will make money. It signifies if it is prudent to undertake a specific decision against the opportunity of undertaking a different decision. As shown in the simplified example in the image, choosing to start a business would provide $10,000 in terms of accounting profits. However, the decision to start a business would provide −$30,000 in terms of economic profits, indicating that the decision to start a business may not be prudent as the opportunity costs outweigh the profit from starting a business. In this case, where the revenue is not enough to cover the opportunity costs, the chosen option may not be the best course of action. When economic profit is zero, all the explicit and implicit costs (opportunity costs) are covered by the total revenue and there is no incentive for reallocation of the resources. This condition is known as normal profit.

Several performance measures of economic profit have been derived to further improve business decision-making such as risk-adjusted return on capital (RAROC) and economic value added (EVA), which directly include a quantified opportunity cost to aid businesses in risk management and optimal allocation of resources. Opportunity cost, as such, is an economic concept in economic theory which is used to maximise value through better decision-making.

In accounting, collecting, processing, and reporting information on activities and events that occur within an organization is referred to as the accounting cycle. To encourage decision-makers to efficiently allocate the resources they have (or those who have trusted them), this information is being shared with them. As a result, the role of accounting has evolved in tandem with the rise of economic activity and the increasing complexity of economic structure. Accounting is not only the gathering and calculation of data that impacts a choice, but it also delves deeply into the decision-making activities of businesses through the measurement and computation of such data. In accounting, it is common practice to refer to the opportunity cost of a decision (option) as a cost. The DCF method has surpassed all others as the primary method of making investment decisions, and opportunity cost has surpassed all others as an essential metric of cash outflow in making investment decisions. For various reasons, the opportunity cost is critical in this form of estimation.

First and foremost, the discounted rate applied in DCF analysis is influenced by an opportunity cost, which impacts project selection and the choice of a discounting rate. Using the firm's original assets in the investment means there is no need for the enterprise to utilize funds to purchase the assets, so there is no cash outflow. However, the cost of the assets must be included in the cash outflow at the current market price. Even though the asset does not result in a cash outflow, it can be sold or leased in the market to generate income and be employed in the project's cash flow. The money earned in the market represents the opportunity cost of the asset utilized in the business venture. As a result, opportunity costs must be incorporated into project planning to avoid erroneous project evaluations. Only those costs directly relevant to the project will be considered in making the investment choice, and all other costs will be excluded from consideration. Modern accounting also incorporates the concept of opportunity cost into the determination of capital costs and capital structure of businesses, which must compute the cost of capital invested by the owner as a function of the ratio of human capital. In addition, opportunity costs are employed to determine to price for asset transfers between industries.

=== Comparative advantage versus absolute advantage ===
When a nation, organisation or individual can produce a product or service at a relatively lower opportunity cost compared to its competitors, it is said to have a comparative advantage. In other words, a country has comparative advantage if it gives up less of a resource to make the same number of products as the other country that has to give up more.

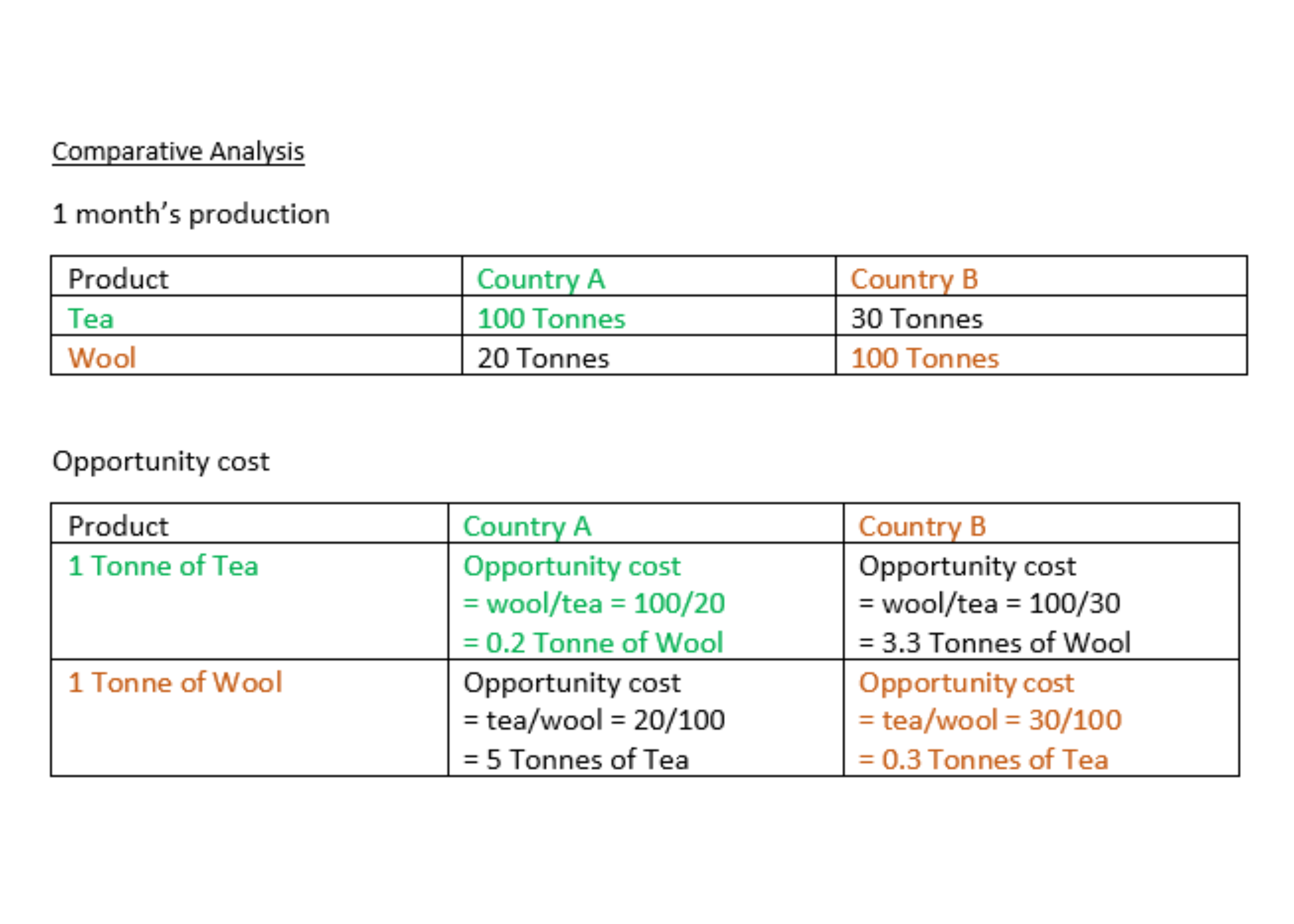
A simple example of comparative advantage

Using the simple example in the image, to make 100 tonnes of tea, Country A has to give up the production of 20 tonnes of wool which means for every 1 tonne of tea produced, 0.2 tonnes of wool has to be forgone. Meanwhile, to make 30 tonnes of tea, Country B needs to sacrifice the production of 100 tonnes of wool, so for each tonne of tea, 3.3 tonnes of wool is forgone. In this case, Country A has a comparative advantage over Country B for the production of tea because it has a lower opportunity cost. On the other hand, to make 1 tonne of wool, Country A has to give up 5 tonnes of tea, while Country B would need to give up 0.3 tonnes of tea, so Country B has a comparative advantage over the production of wool.

Absolute advantage on the other hand refers to how efficiently a party can use its resources to produce goods and services compared to others, regardless of its opportunity costs. For example, if Country A can produce 1 tonne of wool using less manpower compared to Country B, then it is more efficient and has an absolute advantage over wool production, even if it does not have a comparative advantage because it has a higher opportunity cost (5 tonnes of tea).

Absolute advantage refers to how efficiently resources are used whereas comparative advantage refers to how little is sacrificed in terms of opportunity cost. When a country produces what it has the comparative advantage of, even if it does not have an absolute advantage, and trades for those products it does not have a comparative advantage over, it maximises its output since the opportunity cost of its production is lower than its competitors. By focusing on specialising this way, it also maximises its level of consumption.

=== Governmental level ===
Similar to the way people make decisions, governments frequently have to take opportunity cost into account when passing legislation. The potential cost at the government level can be seen when considering, for instance, government spending on war. Assume that entering a war would cost the government $840 billion. They are thereby prevented from using $840 billion to fund, say, healthcare, education, or tax cuts, or to diminish by that sum any budget deficit. The explicit costs are the wages and materials needed to fund soldiers and required equipment, whilst an implicit cost would be the lost output as resources are directed from civilian to military tasks.

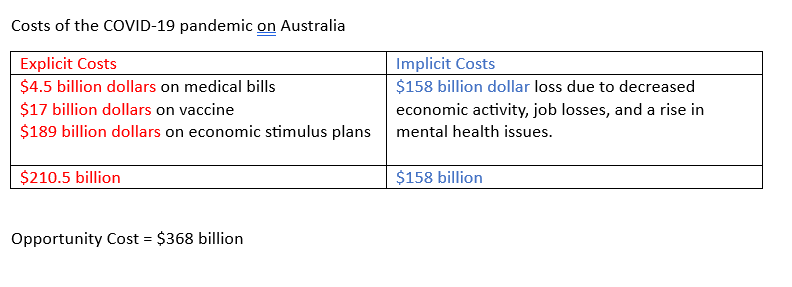
Opportunity cost at a government level example

Another example of opportunity cost at government level is the effects of the COVID-19 pandemic. Governmental responses to the COVID-19 epidemic have resulted in considerable economic and social consequences, both implicit and apparent. Explicit costs are the expenses that the government incurred directly as a result of the pandemic which included $4.5 billion on medical bills, vaccine distribution of over $17 billion, and economic stimulus plans that cost $189 billion. These costs, which are often simpler to measure, resulted in greater public debt, decreased tax income, and increased expenditure by the government. The opportunity costs associated with the epidemic, including lost productivity, slower economic growth, and weakened social cohesiveness, are known as implicit costs. Even while these costs might be more challenging to estimate, they are nevertheless crucial to comprehending the entire scope of the pandemic's effects. For instance, the implementation of lockdowns and other limitations to stop the spread of the virus resulted in a $158 billion loss due to decreased economic activity, job losses, and a rise in mental health issues.

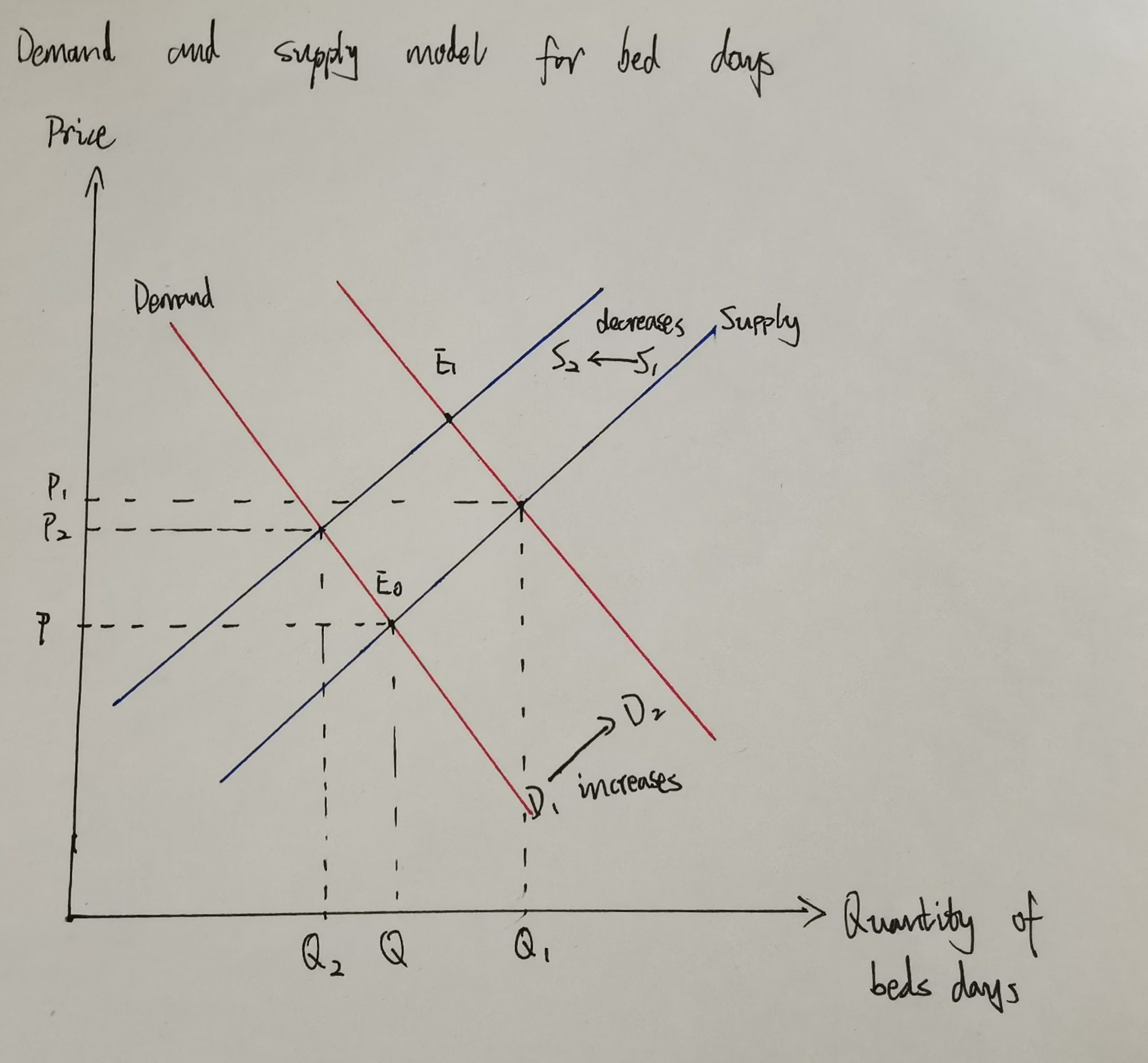
Demand and supply of hospital beds and days during COVID-19

The impact of the COVID-19 pandemic that broke out in recent years on economic operations is unavoidable, the economic risks are not symmetrical, and the impact of COVID-19 is distributed differently in the global economy. Some industries have benefited from the pandemic, while others have almost gone bankrupt. One of the sectors most impacted by the COVID-19 pandemic is the public and private health system. Opportunity cost is the concept of ensuring efficient use of scarce resources, a concept that is central to health economics. The massive increase in the need for intensive care has largely limited and exacerbated the department's ability to address routine health problems. The sector must consider opportunity costs in decisions related to the allocation of scarce resources, premised on improving the health of the population.

However, the opportunity cost of implementing policies to the sector has limited impact in the health sector. Patients with severe symptoms of COVID-19 require close monitoring in the ICU and in therapeutic ventilator support, which is key to treating the disease. In this case, scarce resources include bed days, ventilation time, and therapeutic equipment. Temporary excess demand for hospital beds from patients exceeds the number of bed days provided by the health system. The increased demand for days in bed is due to the fact that infected hospitalized patients stay in bed longer, shifting the demand curve to the right (see curve D2 in Graph1.11). The number of bed days provided by the health system may be temporarily reduced as there may be a shortage of beds due to the widespread spread of the virus. If this situation becomes unmanageable, supply decreases and the supply curve shifts to the left (curve S2 in Graph1.11). A perfect competition model can be used to express the concept of opportunity cost in the health sector. In perfect competition, market equilibrium is understood as the point where supply and demand are exactly the same (points P and Q in Graph1.11). The balance is Pareto optimal equals marginal opportunity cost. Medical allocation may result in some people being better off and others worse off. At this point, it is assumed that the market has produced the maximum outcome associated with the Pareto partial order. As a result, the opportunity cost increases when other patients cannot be admitted to the ICU due to a shortage of beds.

== See also ==
- Austrian School
- Best alternative to a negotiated agreement
- Budget constraint
- Dead-end job
- Economies of scale
- Econometrics
- Fear of missing out
- Lost sales
- No such thing as a free lunch
- Parable of the broken window
- Production–possibility frontier
- Reduced cost
- Time management
- Time sink
- Trade-off
- Transaction cost
- You can't have your cake and eat it
- Perverse subsidies
- Shadow wage
