= Bureau-shaping model =

Bureau-shaping is a rational choice model of bureaucracy and a response to the budget-maximization model. It argues that rational officials will not want to maximize their budgets, but instead to shape their agency so as to maximize their personal utilities from their work. For instance, bureaucrats would prefer to work in small, elite agencies close to political power centres and doing interesting work, rather than to run large-budget agencies with many staff but also many risks and problems. For the same reasons, and to avoid risks, the bureau-shaping model also predicts that senior government bureaucrats will often favour either 'agencification' to other public sector bodies by having policy determination and advice separated from the implementation of the legislated practices of government (as in the UK 'Next Steps' programme, Australian Department - Agency system) or off-loading functions to contractors and privatization. In the health and social work fields, officials will favour 'deinstitutionalization' and 'care in the community'. The model was developed by Patrick Dunleavy from the London School of Economics in Democracy, Bureaucracy and Public Choice (London: Pearson Education, 1991, reissued 2001).

It was propounded in response to William Niskanen's harsh criticism of Public Bureaucracies in his Budget Maximising Model. The Niskanen model predicts that in representative democracies, public bureaucracies will not only generate allocative inefficiency (by oversupplying public goods) but also x-inefficiency (by producing public goods inefficiently). Patrick Dunleavy, a British political scientist who set out to demolish the public choice arguments on bureaucracy, came instead in the end to develop a public choice model of bureaucratic behaviour which combines elements of Peacock’s insight with the original American model. The Dunleavy (1985, p. 300) model of public bureaucracy is built on six basic assumptions. The first three are consistent with Niskanen’s model:

(i) bureau policies are set by bureaucrats interacting with the government;

(ii) governments largely depend on information from bureaus about the costs and value of producing within given ranges of output; and

(iii) bureaucrats maximise their personal utilities (by satisfying "self-regarding, relatively hard-edged preferences") when making official decisions.

Added to these are two assumptions which greatly weaken the budget-maximising conclusion. These are that a bureau’s aggregate policy behaviour is set by some combination of individual decisions made by its officials, although the actual combination that results may be an outcome desired by no bureau member; and that, within broad limits, officials’ influence on bureau policy is always correlated with rank and those nearest the top of bureaus are the most influential. Dunleavy therefore discards Niskanen’s assumption that a bureau’s behaviour will be wholly in line with the preferences of a single senior bureaucrat. In a bureau, where no individual has complete hegemony, budget maximisation is a collective, not an individual good. Rational utility maximising individuals will thus tend to favour strategies that directly advance their personal interests ahead of strategies that advance the collective good. The interaction of the maximising activities of individuals within a bureau will not necessarily lead to budget maximizing.
