= William A. Niskanen =

American economist (1933–2011)

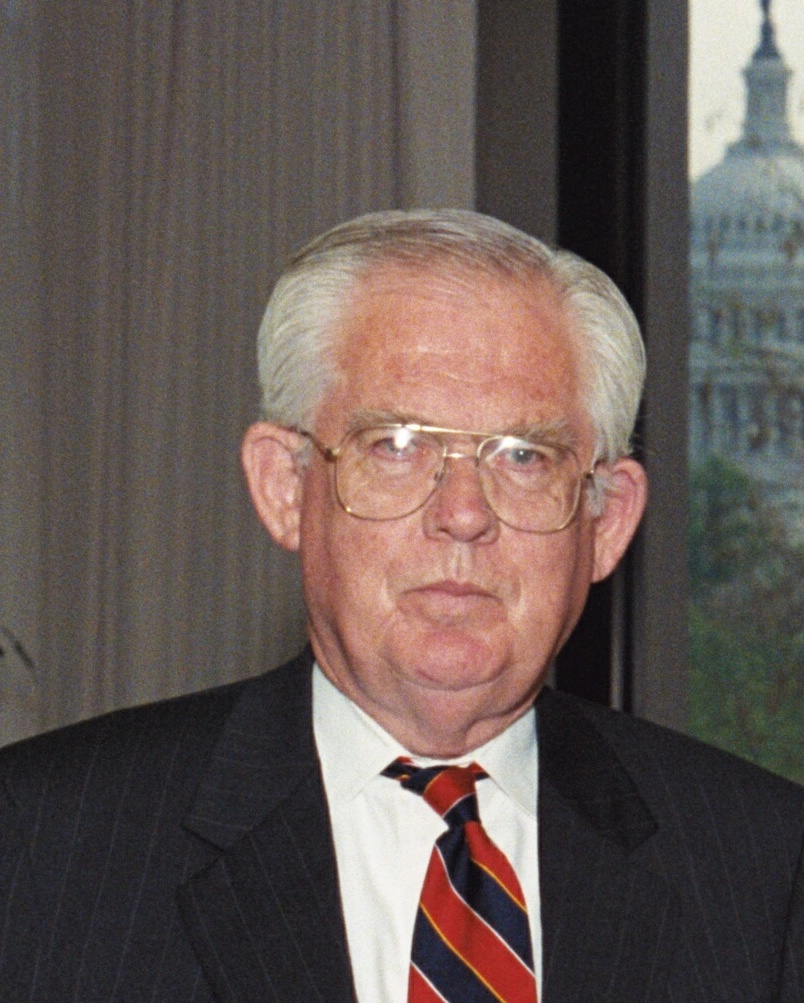
- Niskanen in 1992

Member of the Council of Economic Advisers
- In office 1981–1985
- President: Ronald Reagan

Personal details
- Born: William Arthur Niskanen; March 13, 1933 Bend, Oregon, U.S.
- Died: October 26, 2011 (aged 78) Washington, D.C., U.S.
- Education: Harvard University (BA); University of Chicago (MA, PhD)
- Occupation: Economist
- Known for: Reaganomics

William Arthur Niskanen (/nɪsˈkænən/; March 13, 1933 – October 26, 2011) was an American economist. He was one of the architects of President Ronald Reagan's economic program and contributed to public choice theory. He was also a long-time chairman of the Cato Institute, a libertarian think-tank.

== Early life and education ==
Niskanen was born and raised in Bend, Oregon. He received his B.A. from Harvard University in 1954. He pursued graduate study of economics at the University of Chicago, where his teachers included Milton Friedman and other prominent economists who were then revolutionizing economics, public policy, and law with ideas that would come to be known as the Chicago school of economics. Niskanen received his M.A. in 1955 and his doctorate in 1962, writing his dissertation on the economics of alcoholic beverage sales.

== Career ==
=== Early career ===
After earning his doctoral degree, Niskanen joined the RAND Corporation as a defense policy analyst in 1957, using his economic and mathematical modeling skills to analyze and improve military efficiency. Among his accomplishments was developing a 400-line linear programming model of the Air Force transport system. His programmer for the model was a young William F. Sharpe, who would later win the Nobel economics prize.

Because of his work at RAND, the incoming Kennedy administration appointed Niskanen director of special studies in the Office of the Secretary of Defense. There, he became one of Defense Secretary Robert McNamara's original Pentagon "whiz kids" who used statistical analysis to examine Defense Department operations.

During his time at the Pentagon, Niskanen became disillusioned with the nation's political leadership, later claiming that the president and other executive branch officials "lied with ... regularity" to the public. He frequently quipped that this disillusionment sometimes caused him to question whether the United States truly landed on the moon in 1969.

Niskanen left DOD in 1964 to become director of the Program Analysis Division at the Institute for Defense Analyses. In 1972, he returned to public service as assistant director of the Office of Management and Budget, though his internal criticisms of Nixon administration policy would make his tenure at OMB short.

=== Academia ===
Niskanen left Washington and returned to academia, becoming professor of economics at the University of California at Berkeley in 1972, where he remained until he became chief economist of Ford Motor Company in 1975. While at Berkeley, Niskanen helped establish the school's graduate school of public policy. During this time in California, he became acquainted with then-governor Ronald Reagan, who appointed him to a task force on the state's economy.

Following his dismissal from Ford in 1980 (see below), Niskanen returned to academia, this time to UCLA.

=== Ford Motor Company ===
In 1975, Niskanen was appointed chief economist at the Ford Motor Company under chairman Henry Ford II and president Lee Iacocca. He quickly became critical of Ford's corporate culture and its failure to follow consumer trends, such as the 1970s desire for more fuel-efficient cars because of rising gas prices resulting from OPEC constraints on oil supply.

Foreign automakers, especially Japanese companies, were quick to exploit American consumers' demand for more fuel-efficient cars, gaining a growing share of the U.S. market in the 1970s. Ford responded by asking the U.S. government to place import quotas on Japanese cars. Niskanen, a free-trade advocate, argued internally against this policy, saying that Ford needed to improve its products in light of consumer demand. In response to this criticism, Ford fired Niskanen in 1980.

=== Reagan administration ===
Incoming president Ronald Reagan appointed Niskanen to his Council of Economic Advisers, which was responsible for conducting and analyzing economic research to inform executive branch policies.

In a speech before a women's group in 1984, he commented that women's leaving the workforce to raise children contributed to a disparity in pay between the genders. Niskanen's comment was condemned in 1984, including criticism from Democratic presidential nominee Walter Mondale, who claimed it exemplified a lack of respect toward women by the Reagan administration.

The following year, another of Niskanen's blunt comments ultimately led to his departure from the Reagan administration. During the negotiations over legislation that ultimately became the Tax Reform Act of 1986, Niskanen internally criticized the administration proposal that was drawn up by the Treasury Department under Secretary Donald Regan, telling President Ronald Reagan in front of Secretary Donald Regan that the proposal was "something Walter Mondale would love." Secretary Regan took offense at the comment and, after becoming President Reagan's chief of staff, blocked Niskanen's ascendancy to the chair of the Council of Economic Advisers after Martin Feldstein left to return to Harvard. Niskanen served as acting chair for a brief period, but then resigned from the council. Niskanen later chastised Regan as "a tower of jelly" in his book Reaganomics.

=== Cato Institute ===
After leaving the Reagan administration, Niskanen joined the libertarian Cato Institute, where he served as chairman of the board of directors from 1985 to 2008 and was an active policy scholar. He was chairman emeritus of Cato from 2008 until his death in 2011.

In March 2012, a dispute broke out between Charles and David Koch and Niskanen's widow, Kathryn Washburn, over the ownership of Niskanen's ownership share in Cato.

== Scholarly contributions ==
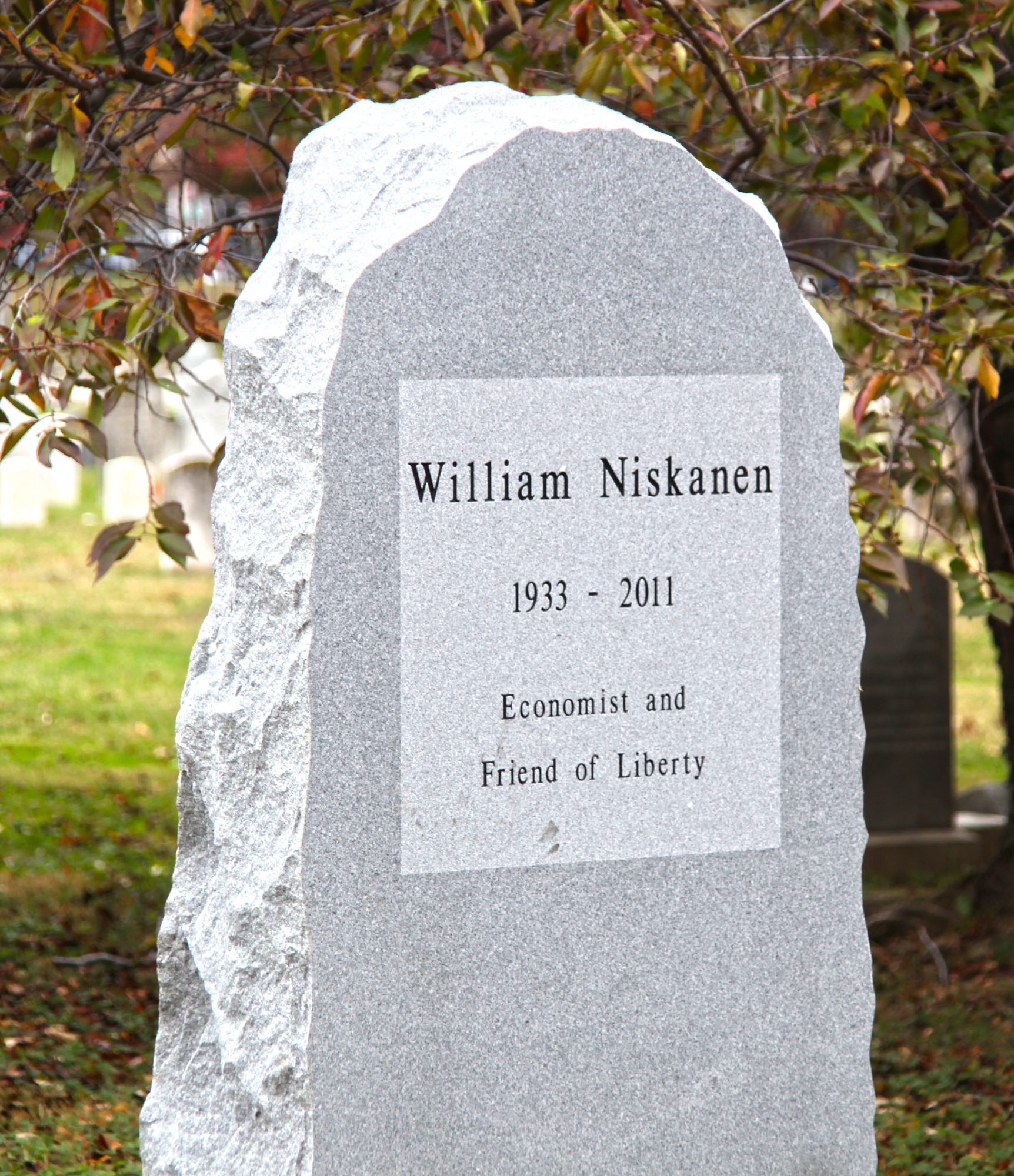
Niskanen's grave at the Congressional Cemetery

Niskanen was a prominent contributor to public choice theory, a field of both economics and political science that examines the behavior of politicians and other government officials. Public choice eschewed the traditional notion that these agents are motivated by selfless interest in the public good, and instead considered them as typically self-interested, like other agents. His chief contribution to public choice theory was the budget-maximizing model – the notion that bureaucrats will attempt to maximize their agency's budget and authority. He presented this theory in the 1971 book, Bureaucracy and Representative Government.

=== Publications ===
Niskanen authored several books, academic articles, and essays on government and politics. His most noted work, Bureaucracy and Representative Government, published in 1971, made a great impact on the field of public management and strongly challenged the field of public administration in the spirit of Ludwig von Mises's Bureaucracy. The book was for a long time out of print, but was reissued with several additional essays as, William Niskanen, Bureaucracy and Public Economics (Cheltenham, UK: Edward Elgar, 1994). Niskanen's work was an early text in rational choice models of bureaucracy. In his work he proposed the budget-maximizing model.

Another of his noted works was his 1988 book Reaganomics, which describes both the policies and inside-the-White House politics of Reagan's economic program. Washington Post columnist Lou Cannon, author of the biography President Reagan: The Role of a Lifetime, described the book as "a definitive and notably objective account of administration economic policies."

Niskanen's final book was Reflections of a Political Economist (2008). The book is a collection of essays and book reviews on public policy and economic topics, and serves as an intellectual biography.

== Personal life ==
Niskanen had three daughters. His widow, Kathryn Washburn, had worked for the National Oceanic and Atmospheric Administration and United States Department of the Interior before entering the non-profit sector. Niskanen died of a stroke on October 26, 2011, in Washington, D.C.
