= Platform imperialism =

Cultural influence via digital platforms

Platform Imperialism is the concentrated power of the global digital market by a small number of Western companies. This power is primarily concentrated in the U.S. through companies such as Netflix, Google, and Facebook. This system leads to an unequal distribution of power between the platform owners and users, where the users are mostly nations within the Global South. This distribution of power is relevant in how these Western dominated platforms influence and skew global culture toward its own perspectives, collect data from other nations, and centralize the industry's capital to a handful of companies in the West, allowing them stronger control over the digital economy.

Platform imperialism, also known as digital imperialism, has been described by scholars in political economy, critical cultural studies and media studies. The discourse on platform imperialism includes several core areas, such as intellectual property, the global digital divide, free labor, and the nation-state, focusing on the role of the nation-state alongside transnational capital. Digital platforms have been influential in capital accumulation and digital culture in the networked 21st century. Numerous digital platforms, such as smartphones, social media, and OTT (over-the-top) platforms, are crucial because they function as digital mediators.

Platform imperialism is explained as giant tech corporations (mainly in the U.S.) creating a system of dependency through using their digital systems to centralize control, data-mine, and monetize it for global power. This process recreates the patterns of the exploitation of the Global South that have been embedded throughout history in colonial power structures, threatening the sovereignty of these nations.

== Background ==
Dal Yong Jin developed the concept of platform imperialism to examine the global expansion and dominance of digital platforms. Major theoreticians, such as Herbert Schiller, Thomas Guback, and Jeremy Tunstall, argued that a few Western countries controlled the international flow of television programs and films. The dominance of a few Western countries, particularly the U.S., was distinctive, as the robust U.S. cultural industry exerted influence over the cultural life of other nations. However, with the emergence of numerous countries that have developed their own popular cultures, such as Mexico, Brazil, Japan, Hong Kong, and Korea, the one-way flow of popular culture from the U.S. to other countries has waned. Due to the arrival of pluralism, theoreticians argued that cultural imperialism is over. However, with the rise of digital platforms, such as social media, smartphones, and OTT (over-the-top) platforms, the imperialism discourse has resurfaced as the U.S. has become the primary actor in the digital platform field.

== Derivative platform imperialism ==
Based on the notion of platform imperialism, numerous scholars have described specific forms of platform imperialism, such as Netflix Imperialism, Facebook Imperialism, and Amazon's platform imperialism. For example, in the global cultural sphere in the early 21st century, Netflix has continued to reign supreme due in large part to its AI-supported algorithms and data, as well as many cultural materials. Netflix has continued to develop original content while licensing cultural programs from other countries; therefore, it rapidly increases the number of paid subscribers and, therefore, financial gains. Local OTT platforms in many countries cannot compete with Netflix due to the lack of cultural content and global networks. The tension between Netflix and local OTT platforms increases, but Netflix controls the entire OTT platform market, resulting in Netflix imperialism.

== Sources ==
- Bannerman, S. (2022). Platform imperialism, communications law and relational sovereignty. New Media & Society, 26(4), 1816-1833.
- Jin, Dal Yong (2025). “Platform Imperialism Theory from the Asian Perspectives.” Social Media + Society 11(1): 1-6.
- Jin, Dal Yong (2015). Digital Platforms, Imperialism and Political Culture. London: Routledge.
- Jutel, O., & Salter, L. A. (2025). Platform imperialism and disinformation in Aotearoa-New Zealand. Platforms & Society, 2.
- Davis, S. (2021). What is Netflix imperialism? Interrogating the monopoly aspirations of the ‘World’s largest television network.’ Information, Communication & Society, 26(6), 1143–1158.
- Ji Hoon Park, Kristin April Kim, Yongsuk Lee (2023). Theorizing the Korean Wave| Netflix and Platform Imperialism: How Netflix Alters the Ecology of the Korean TV Drama Industry. International Journal of Communication 17
- Tanter, M (2024).How Netflix and “Platform Imperialism” Compromise the Korean Drama Industry. In Contemporary Asian Popular Culture
