= Principles of Economics =

Principles of Economics may refer to a number of texts by different academic economists:

- Grundsätze der Volkswirtschaftslehre (Principles of Economics) (1870) by Carl Menger, the first to use the title, dropping "political" from the term "political economy"
- Principles of Economics (1890) by Alfred Marshall
- Principles of Economics (1998) by N. Gregory Mankiw, a popular contemporary and introductory economics text
