= Isovalue lines =

In microeconomics, in a standard trade model with two products, an isovalue line is the vector of combinations for which the market value of total production is constant. The formula for isovalue line V is:

$V=QxPx+QyPy$

in which:

Q is quantity

P is price

x and y are products.

For example: Assume an economy that only produces bread and wine and in which relative prices are fixed, say one bottle of wine equals the price of three breads. The isovalue line V (in a graph with bread as x and wine as y) slopes less than 45° downward. The exact slope is derived from the wine/bread price relation, in this case -1/3.
