= Universe (economics) =

Population studied in economics or marketing

In economics and marketing a universe is a population to be studied or measured. The concept is closely related to "population" and can be understood as its empirical definition.

In economics a population to be measured is described as a "universe", and the measures which are generated are intended to reflect the behavior of that population. Specifically, The "universe" is a synonym for "target population", referring to units that fulfill the intended group criterion within a specified time duration and geographic area. Different statistical surveys may measure related, but different, universes and have to be adjusted to reflect this difference. For example, the American Bureau of Labor Statistics has a household survey and an establishment survey to measure employment. The differences in the populations and behavior that these two surveys measure are said to be the differences in their "universe".

The word has a similar meaning in marketing, where it describes the activity in a given population. For example, ASCAP measures airplay in different radio "universes" to determine royalties for different songs, because e.g. air play in the "classical" universe is compensated differently from popular music. It also fundamental to television audience measurement: advertisers buy into programmes based on the ratings in different demographic universes and those different universes will cost different amounts. For example, a hair dye ad campaign may buy 1000 Gross Rating Points (GRP) in the Women 25-44 universe in order to target that particular audience, rather than a demographic irrelevant to their product.

== See also ==
- Universe (mathematics)
