= Shareholder yield =

The term shareholder yield captures the three ways in which the management of a public company can distribute cash to shareholders: cash dividends, stock repurchases and debt reduction.

== Calculation ==
Shareholder yield is the sum of three components:

$$\text{Shareholder Yield} = \text{Dividend Yield} + \text{Buyback Yield} + \text{Debt Paydown Yield}$$

Where:

- Dividend yield = Annual dividends per share / Price per share
- Buyback yield = (Shares repurchased - Shares issued) x Price / Market capitalization. A negative value indicates net dilution.
- Debt paydown yield = Net debt reduction / Market capitalization

Some formulations omit the debt paydown component and define shareholder yield as simply dividend yield plus net buyback yield.

== Overview ==
Dividends are the typical way a company distributes cash to its stockholders.

Stock repurchases also increase shareholder value. Reducing the number of shares outstanding means each then represents an increased fraction of the company's assets. Repurchases are counteracted by dilution of the stock if the company issues new shares, either to make an acquisition or in stock-based compensation, such as issuing stock options to management and others. The above formula subtracts out dilution to give net repurchases.

Mebane Faber explored this topic in his book Shareholder Yield: A Better Approach to Dividend Investing. The thesis is that a more holistic approach, incorporating both cash dividends and net repurchases, is a superior way to sort and own stocks.

Reducing debt can also produce a de facto dividend, assuming the value of the firm remains the same; reducing debt increases shareholder value. A paper by Nobel laureates Franco Modigliani and Merton H. Miller entitled The Cost of Capital, Corporation Finance and the Theory of Investment explained how debt reduction increases shareholder value. The authors state that a firm's value is independent of how it is financed, provided that one ignores the tax effect of debt interest. So the use of free cash flow to repay debt results in a transfer of wealth from the debtor to the shareholder.

== History of term ==
The term shareholder yield was coined by William W. Priest of Epoch Investment Partners in a paper in 2005 entitled The Case for Shareholder Yield as a Dominant Driver of Future Equity Returns as a way to look more holistically at how companies allocate and distribute cash rather than considering dividends in isolation. This concept was further detailed in the 2007 book, Free Cash Flow and Shareholder Yield: New Priorities for the Global Investor, by William W. Priest and Lindsay H. McClelland.

== See also ==
- Dividend yield
- Stock repurchase
- Free cash flow
- Value investing
