= Nanoeconomics =

Economic theory of single transactions

Nanoeconomics is defined as the economic theory of single transactions. The term was proposed by Kenneth J. Arrow in 1987. The term has also been used to describe a level of analysis below traditional microeconomics, which is equivalent to the first definition and to describe the economics of nanotechnology.

== See also ==
- Agential realism
- Information economics
- Postpositivism
- Quantum pseudo-telepathy
- Quantum social science
