= Making-up price =

Price at which speculative bargains are carried over from one account to the next

A making-up price, in the London and other British Stock Exchanges, is the price at which speculative bargains are carried over from one account to the next. The carrying over of a "bull" position in Eries, for example, implies a sale for cash and a simultaneous repurchase for the new account, both bargains being done at the making-up price. This is fixed at noon on carry-over day, in accordance with the market price then current. The term is also used in New York City, where the making-up prices are fixed at the end of a day's business, in accordance with the American system of daily settlements.
