= Profit (economics) =

Concept in economics

Difference between how accountants and economists view a firm

In economics, profit is the difference between revenue that an economic entity has received from its outputs and total costs of its inputs, also known as "surplus value". It is equal to total revenue minus total cost, including both explicit and implicit costs.

It is different from accounting profit, which only relates to the explicit costs that appear on a firm's financial statements. An accountant measures the firm's accounting profit as the firm's total revenue minus only the firm's explicit costs. An economist includes all costs, both explicit and implicit costs, when analyzing a firm. Therefore, economic profit is smaller than accounting profit.

Normal profit is often viewed in conjunction with economic profit. Normal profits in business refer to a situation where a company generates revenue that is equal to the total costs incurred in its operation, thus allowing it to remain operational in a competitive industry. It is the minimum profit level that a company can achieve to justify its continued operation in the market where there is competition. In order to determine if a company has achieved normal profit, they first have to calculate their economic profit. If the company's total revenue is equal to its total costs, then its economic profit is equal to zero and the company is in a state of normal profit. Normal profit occurs when resources are being used in the most efficient way at the highest and best use. Normal profit and economic profit are economic considerations while accounting profit refers to the profit a company reports on its financial statements each period.

Normal profit = Total revenue – Total costs
Normal profit = Revenues – Total costs
Normal profit = Revenues – (Implicit costs + Explicit costs)

Economic profits arise in markets which are non-competitive and have significant barriers to entry, i.e. monopolies and oligopolies. The inefficiencies and lack of competition in these markets foster an environment where firms can set prices or quantities instead of being price-takers, which is what occurs in a perfectly competitive market. In a perfectly competitive market when long-run economic equilibrium is reached, economic profit would become non-existent, because there is no incentive for firms either to enter or to leave the industry.

== Competitive and contestable markets ==
Only in the short run can a firm in a perfectly competitive market make an economic profit.

Companies do not make any economic profits in a perfectly competitive market once it has reached a long run equilibrium. If an economic profit was available, there would be an incentive for new firms to enter the industry, aided by a lack of barriers to entry, until it no longer existed. When new firms enter the market, the overall supply increases. Furthermore, these intruders are forced to offer their product at a lower price to entice consumers to buy the additional supply they have created and to compete with the incumbent firms (see Monopoly profit § Persistence). As the incumbent firms within the industry face losing their existing customers to the new entrants, they are also forced to reduce their prices. Therefore, increased competition reduces price and cost to the minimum of the long run average costs. At this point, price equals both the marginal cost and the average total cost for each good production. Once this has occurred a perfect competition exists and economic profit is no longer available. When this occurs, economic agents outside the industry find no advantage to entering the market, as there is no economic profit to be gained. Then, the supply of the product stops increasing, and the price charged for the product stabilizes, settling into an equilibrium.

The same is likewise true of the long run equilibria of monopolistically competitive industries, and more generally any market which is held to be contestable. Normally, a firm that introduces a differentiated product can initially secure temporary market power for a short while (See Monopoly Profit § Persistence). At this stage, the initial price the consumer must pay for the product is high, and the demand for, as well as the availability of the product in the market, will be limited. In the long run however, when the profitability of the product is well established, and because there are few barriers to entry, the number of firms that produce this product will increase. Eventually, the supply of the product will become relatively large, and the price of the product will reduce to the level of the average cost of production. When this finally occurs, all economic profit associated with producing and selling the product disappears, and the initial monopoly turns into a competitive industry. In the case of contestable markets, the cycle is often ended with the departure of the former "hit and run" entrants to the market, returning the industry to its previous state, just with a lower price and no economic profit for the incumbent firms.

Economic profit can, however, occur in competitive and contestable markets in the short run, since short run economic profits attract new competitors and prices fall. Economic loss forces firms out of the industry and prices rise till marginal revenue equals marginal cost, then reach long run equilibrium. As a result of firms jostling for market position. Once risk is accounted for, long-lasting economic profit in a competitive market is thus viewed as the result of constant cost-cutting and performance improvement ahead of industry competitors, allowing costs to be below the market-set price.

== Uncompetitive markets ==
A monopolist can set a price in excess of costs, making an economic profit (shaded). The above picture shows a monopolist (only one firm in the industry/market) that obtains a (monopoly) economic profit. An oligopoly usually has "economic profit" also, but usually faces an industry/market with more than just one firm (they must share available demand at the market price).

Economic profit is much more prevalent in uncompetitive markets such as in a perfect monopoly or oligopoly situation, where few substitutes exist. In these scenarios, individual firms have some element of market power. Although monopolists are constrained by consumer demand, they are not price takers, but instead either price or quantity setters. Due to the output effect and the price effect, marginal revenue for uncompetitive markets is very different from marginal revenue for competitive firms. In the output effect, more output is sold, quantity sold is higher. In the price effect, this reduces the prices firms charge for every unit they sell, and cut in price reduces revenue on the units it was already selling. Therefore, in uncompetitive market, marginal revenue is less than its price. This allows the firm to set a price which is higher than that which would be found in a similar but more competitive industry, allowing the firms to maintain an economic profit in both the short and long run.

The existence of economic profits depends on the prevalence of barriers to entry, which stop other firms from entering into the industry and sapping away profits like they would in a more competitive market. Examples of barriers to entry include patents, land rights, and certain zoning laws. These barriers allow firms to maintain a large portion of market share due to new entrants being unable to obtain the necessary requirements or pay the initial costs of entry.

An oligopoly is a case where barriers are present, but more than one firm is able to maintain the majority of the market share. In an oligopoly, firms are able to collude and limit production, thereby restricting supply and maintaining a constant economic profit. An extreme case of an uncompetitive market is a monopoly, where only one firm has the ability to supply a good which has no close substitutes. In this case, the monopolist can set its price at any level it desires, maintaining a substantial economic profit. In both scenarios, firms are able to maintain an economic profit by setting prices well above the costs of production, receiving an income that is significantly more than its implicit and explicit costs.

== Government intervention ==
The existence of uncompetitive markets puts consumers at risk of paying substantially higher prices for lower quality products. When monopolies and oligopolies hold large portions of the market share, less emphasis is placed on consumer demand than there would be in a perfectly competitive market, especially if the good provided has an inelastic demand. Government intervention in the form of restrictions and subsidies can also create uncompetitive markets. Governments can also intervene in uncompetitive markets in an attempt to raise the number of firms in the industry, but these firms cannot support the needs of consumers as if they were born out of a profit generated on a competitive market basis.

In a regulated industry, the government examines firms' marginal cost structure and allows them to charge a price that is no greater than this marginal cost. This does not necessarily ensure zero economic profit for the firm, but eliminates a monopoly profit.

Competition laws were created to prevent powerful firms from using their economic power to artificially create barriers to entry in an attempt to protect their economic profits. This includes the use of predatory pricing toward smaller competitors. For example, in the United States, Microsoft Corporation was initially convicted of breaking Anti-Trust Law and engaging in anti-competitive behaviour in order to form one such barrier in United States v. Microsoft. After a successful appeal on technical grounds, Microsoft agreed to a settlement with the Department of Justice in which they were faced with stringent oversight procedures and explicit requirements designed to prevent this predatory behaviour. With lower barriers, new firms can enter into the market again, making the long run equilibrium much more like that of a competitive industry, with no economic profit for firms and more reasonable prices for consumers.

On the other hand, if a government feels it is impractical to have a competitive market—such as in the case of a natural monopoly—it will allow a monopolistic market to occur. The government will regulate the existing uncompetitive market and control the price the firms charge for their product. For example, the old AT&T (regulated) monopoly, which existed before the courts ordered its breakup, had to get government approval to raise its prices. The government examined the monopoly's costs, and determined whether or not the monopoly should be able raise its price. If the government felt that the cost did not justify a higher price, it rejected the monopoly's application for a higher price. Though a regulated firm will not have an economic profit as large as it would in an unregulated situation, it can still make profits well above a competitive firm in a truly competitive market.

== Maximization ==
It is a standard economic assumption (although not necessarily a perfect one in the real world) that, other things being equal, a firm will attempt to maximize its profits. Given that profit is defined as the difference in total revenue and total cost, a firm achieves its maximum profit by operating at the point where the difference between the two is at its greatest. The goal of maximizing profit is also what leads firms to enter markets where economic profit exists, with the main focus being to maximize production without significantly increasing its marginal cost per good. In markets which do not show interdependence, this point can either be found by looking at these two curves directly, or by finding and selecting the best of the points where the gradients of the two curves (marginal revenue and marginal cost respectively) are equal. In the real world, it is not so easy to know exactly firm's marginal revenue and the marginal cost of last goods sold. For example, it is difficult for firms to know the price elasticity of demand for their good – which determines the MR. In interdependent markets, It means firm's profit also depends on how other firms react, game theory must be used to derive a profit maximizing solution.

Another significant factor for profit maximization is market fractionation. A company may sell goods in several regions or in several countries. Profit is maximized by treating each location as a separate market. Rather than matching supply and demand for the entire company the matching is done within each market. Each market has different competitions, different supply constraints (like shipping) and different social factors. When the price of goods in each market area is set by each market then overall profit is maximized.

== Other applications of the term ==
The social profit from a firm's activities is the accounting profit plus or minus any externalities or consumer surpluses that occur in its activity. An externality including positive externality and negative externality is an effect that production/consumption of a specific good exerts on people who are not involved. Pollution is an example for negative externality.

Consumer surplus is an economic indicator which measures consumer benefits. The price that consumers pay for a product is not greater than the price they desire to pay, and in this case there will be consumer surplus.

For the supply side of economics, the general school of thought is that profit is meant to ensure shareholder yield. While it is the case that profits are a means for shareholder returns, it also fulfills other functions. A target surplus may secure long-term solvency in the event of facing potential adversity. Capital surplus may be used to finance investments with significant capital expenditures or charitable contributions. All in all, producer surplus concerns several factors of interest for a for-profit economic entity.

== See also ==
- Economic surplus
- Economic rent
- Economic value added
- Externality
- Incremental profit
- Inverse demand function
- Profit motive
- Profitability index
- Rate of profit
- Superprofit
- Surplus value
- Tendency of the rate of profit to fall
- Value (economics)
