= Scan-back allowance =

In marketing, a scan-back allowance is an amount paid by a manufacturer to retailers based on the amount of the product sold at a special reduced price for a specified length of time.
