= Budget-maximizing model =

Stream of public choice theory and rational choice analysis in public administration

The budget-maximizing model is a stream of public choice theory and rational choice analysis in public administration inaugurated by William Niskanen. Niskanen first presented the idea in 1968, and later developed it into a book published in 1971. According to the budget-maximizing model, rational bureaucrats will always and everywhere seek to increase their budgets in order to increase their own power, thereby contributing strongly to state growth and potentially reducing social efficiency. The bureau-shaping model has been developed as a response to the budget-maximizing model. Niskanen's inspiration could also have been Parkinson's law sixteen years earlier (1955).

== Niskanen's budget maximizing bureaucrat ==
The model contemplates a bureaucrat who heads a public administration department, and who will try to maximize the department's budget, thus increasing its salary and prestige.

There is a demand for the department's services on the part of electors and voters, but, contrary to privately managed firms, which directly offer their products and services to these electors, the department is responsible for producing the services which will then be supplied by the Legislature to the electors.

It will therefore be the legislature, or Government, the agent which defines the department's budget, depending on the quantity which it supplies. The more services the department supplies, the higher will its budget be. Therefore, the bureaucrat's objective will be to maximize the quantity of services supplied, subject to a social welfare break-even constraint. This means that the dead weight loss generated by excessive production of services must never be higher than the elector's consumer surplus (otherwise, the Legislature would notice that something was wrong with the department's activity, which would be causing social losses and not gains).

In other words, a typical, private-sector utility maximizing model would anticipate that the department would expand services (and budgets) to the point that the marginal cost and marginal benefits are equated. In Niskanen's model, he would predict that average costs and benefits would be equated instead of the marginals.
