= Implicit cost =

Economic concept

In economics, an implicit cost (also called an imputed cost, implied cost or notional cost) is the opportunity cost equal to what a firm must give up in order to use a factor of production for which it already owns and thus does not pay rent. It is the opposite of an explicit cost, which is borne directly. In other words, an implicit cost is any cost that results from using an asset instead of renting it out, selling it, or using it differently. The term also applies to foregone income from choosing not to work.

Implicit costs also represent the divergence between economic profit (total revenues minus total costs, where total costs are the sum of implicit and explicit costs) and accounting profit (total revenues minus only explicit costs). Since economic profit includes these extra opportunity costs, it will always be less than or equal to accounting profit.

Lipsey (1975) uses the example of a firm sitting on an expensive plot worth $10,000 a month in rent which it bought for a mere $50 a hundred years before. If the firm cannot obtain a profit after deducting $10,000 a month for this implicit cost, it ought to move premises (or close down completely) and take the rent instead. In calculating this figure, the firm ought to ignore the figure of $50, and remember instead to look at the land's current value.

== See also ==
- Cost
- Economic profit
- Imputation (economics)
- Cost of goods sold
