= Explicit cost =

An explicit cost is a direct payment made to others in the course of running a business, such as wage, rent and materials, as opposed to implicit costs, where no actual payment is made. It is possible still to underestimate these costs, however: for example, pension contributions and other "perks" must be taken into account when considering the cost of labor.

Explicit costs are taken into account along with implicit ones when considering economic profit. Accounting profit only takes explicit costs into account.
