= Target surplus =

Target surplus represents the amount of additional capital held by a financial institution beyond the regulatory reserve requirements in order to reduce the chances of breaching capital adequacy or solvency requirements.

== See also ==
- Current ratio
- Working capital
