= Net investment =

In economics, net investment is spending which increases the availability of fixed capital goods or means of production and goods inventories. It is the total spending on newly produced physical capital (fixed investment) and on inventories (inventory investment)—that is, gross investment—minus replacement investment, which simply replaces depreciated capital goods. It is productive capital formation plus net additions to the stock of housing and the stock of inventories. This figure provides a sense of the real expenditure on durable goods.
