= Omnibus Budget Reconciliation Act of 1981 =

- Long title: An Act To provide for reconciliation pursuant to section 301 of the first concurrent resolution on the budget for the fiscal year 1982.
- Acronyms (colloquial): OBRA
- Nicknames: Gramm-Latta
- Enacted by: the 97th United States Congress

Citations
- Public law: Pub. L. 97–35
- Statutes at Large: 95 Stat. 357

Legislative history
- Introduced in the House as H.R. 3982 on 19 June 1981; Committee consideration by House Budget Committee; Passed the House on 26 June 1981 (232–193); Passed the Senate on 13 July 1981 (Voice Vote); Reported by the joint conference committee on 29 July 1981; agreed to by the House on 31 July 1981 (Unanimous Consent) and by the Senate on 31 July 1981 (80-14); Signed into law by President Ronald Reagan on August 13, 1981

The Omnibus Budget Reconciliation Act of 1981 is the federal budget enacted by the 97th United States Congress and signed into law by U.S. President Ronald Reagan. The bill established federal expenditures for fiscal year 1982, which ran from 1 October 1981 through 30 September 1982. The budget bill was the spending counterpart to the revenue bill, the Economic Recovery Tax Act of 1981. The two bills progressed through Congress and were signed by the President together.

Ronald Reagan was elected on his platform of reducing overall federal spending while increasing spending on the military, cutting taxes and balancing the budget. The OBRA cut the federal budget by $36 billion in FY1982 and a cumulative $140 billion including the out years 1983 and 1984. Military spending was raised from $176 billion in FY1981 to $221 billion in FY1982. The Economic Recovery Tax Act was one of the largest tax cuts in US history. The ERTA and the Tax Reform Act of 1986 are together known as the Reagan tax cuts. The tax and spending cuts comprised what some contemporaries described as Reaganomics and the "Reagan Revolution." The Omnibus Budget Reconciliation Act of 1981 was remarkable for Congress's use of the Reconciliation process.

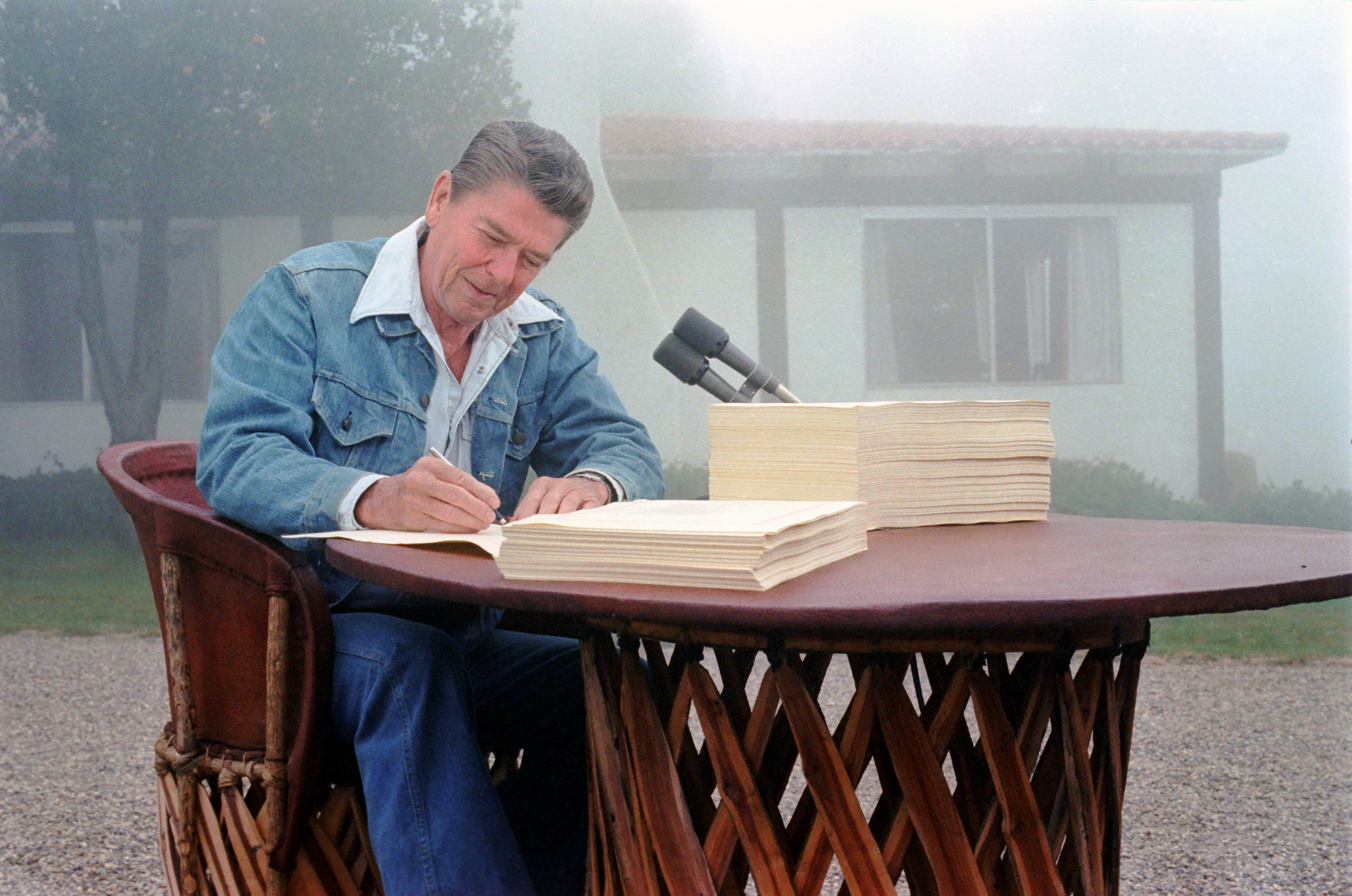
President Ronald Reagan signing the Economic Recovery Tax Act of 1981 and the Omnibus Budget Reconciliation Act of 1981 at his Santa Barbara, California ranch, Rancho del Cielo, 13 August 1981. Photograph by official White House photographer, Karl Schumacher, courtesy of the Ronald Reagan Presidential Library (C03490-4A, https://www.reaganlibrary.gov/archives/photo/c03490-01).

== See also ==
- Economic Recovery Tax Act of 1981
- Tax Equity and Fiscal Responsibility Act of 1982
- Domestic policy of the Ronald Reagan administration
- 97th United States Congress
- Congressional Budget and Impoundment Control Act of 1974
- Reconciliation (United States Congress)
