= Domestic policy of the Reagan administration =

This article discusses the domestic policy of the Ronald Reagan administration from 1981 to 1989. Reagan's policies stressed conservative economic values, starting with his implementation of supply-side economic policies, dubbed as "Reaganomics" by both supporters and detractors. His policies also included the largest tax cut in American history as well as increased defense spending as part of his Soviet strategy. However, he significantly raised (non-income) taxes four times due to economic conditions and reforms, but the tax reforms instituted during presidency brought top marginal rates to their lowest levels since 1931, such that by 1988, the top US marginal tax rate was 28%.

Notable events included his firing of nearly 12,000 striking air traffic control workers and appointing the first woman to the Supreme Court bench, Sandra Day O'Connor. He believed in federalism and free markets, passed policies to encourage development of private business, and routinely criticized and defunded the public sector. Despite his support for limited government, he greatly accelerated the nation's war on drugs.

== "Reaganomics" and the economy ==
=== Policies ===
Reagan gives a televised address from the Oval Office, outlining his plan for Tax Reduction Legislation in July 1981.

Based on supply-side economics, President Reagan implemented his economic policies in 1981. The four pillars of the policies were to:

1. Reduce marginal tax rates on income from labor and capital.
2. Reduce regulation.
3. Tighten the money supply to reduce inflation.
4. Reduce the growth of government spending.

By reducing or eliminating decades-long social programs, while at the same time lowering taxes and marginal tax rates, the President's approach to handling the economy marked a significant departure from that of many of his predecessor's Keynesian policies. Milton Friedman, the monetarist economist who was an intellectual architect of free-market policies, was a primary influence on Reagan.

When Reagan took office, the country faced the highest rate of inflation since 1947 (average annual rate of 13.5% in 1980), and interest rates as high as 13% (the Fed funds rate in December 1980). These were considered the nation's principal economic problems and were all considered components of "stagflation". Reagan sought to stimulate the economy with large, across-the-board tax cuts. The expansionary fiscal policies soon became known as "Reaganomics", and were considered by some to be the most serious attempt to change the course of U.S. economic policy of any administration since the New Deal. His radical tax reforms, in combination with a curb on domestic social spending, harsh restraints applied by the Federal Reserve Board under Paul Volcker on the nation's money supply, and heavy government borrowing required to finance the budget and trade deficits, as well as military expenditures, produced significant economic expansion and reduced inflation. Inflation was reduced by more than ten percentage points, reaching a low of 1.9% annual average inflation in 1986.

One of the Reagan administration's strategies to reduce government spending was privatization of government functions, paying contractors to do work that government agencies had formerly done.

=== Economic record ===
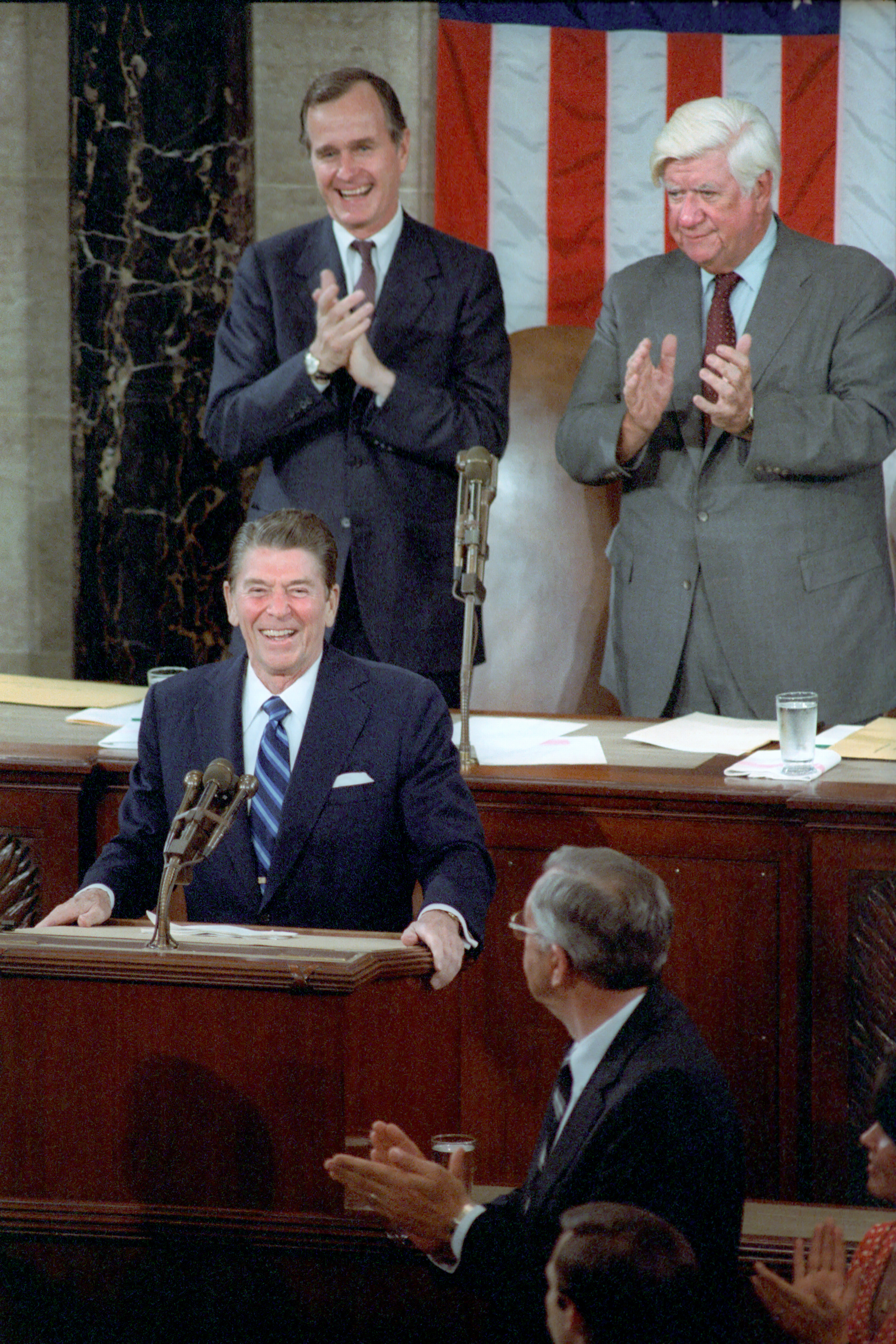
Reagan addresses Congress and the nation on his economic program, 1981

President Reagan's tenure marked a time of expanded economic prosperity for many Americans. The misery index sank to 9.72 from a high of 19.33, the greatest improvement record for a President since Harry S. Truman left office. In terms of American households, the percentage of total households making less than $10,000 a year (in real 2007 dollars) shrunk from 8.8% in 1980 to 8.3% in 1988 while the percentage of households making over $75,000 went from 20.2% to 25.7% during that period. However, the number of Americans below the poverty level did not decline at all. The number of children, ages 18 years and younger, below the poverty level increased from 11.543 million in 1980, 18.3% of children, to 12.455, 19.5%, in 1988. Also, the situation of low income groups was affected by the reduction of social spending, and inequality increased. The share of total income received by the 5% highest-income households grew from 16.5% in 1980 to 18.3% in 1988 and the share of the highest fifth of income increased from 44.1% to 46.3% in same years. In contrast, the share of total income of the lowest fifth of households fell from 4.2% in 1980 to 3.8% in 1988 and the second poorest fifth from 10.2% to 9.6%.

In August 1981, after negotiations with the Republican-controlled Senate and the Democratic-controlled House, Reagan signed the largest marginal tax cut in American history into law at his California ranch. However, the 1981 marginal cuts were partially offset by bracket creep and increased Social Security rates the following year.

Unemployment hit a low of 5.3% in 1988 after peaking at over 10% in 1982. Real GDP growth recovered throughout Reagan's term, averaging +3.5% per year, with a high of +7.3% in 1984. The average annual GDP growth during Reagan's presidency was the fifth highest since the Great Depression and the highest of any Republican president. Inflation decreased significantly, falling from 13.6% in 1980 to 4.1% by 1988, and 16 million new jobs were created. The net effect of all Reagan-era tax bills resulted in a 1% decrease of government revenues (as a percentage of GDP), with the revenue-shrinking effects of the 1981 tax cut (-3% of GDP) and the revenue-gaining effects of the 1982 tax hike (~+1% of GDP), while subsequent bills were more revenue-neutral. However, tax revenue itself nominally increased massively by 103.1% from 1981 through 1989, largely as a result of more loopholes abolished than tax rates lowered.

During the Reagan Administration, federal receipts grew at an average rate of 8.2% (2.5% attributed to higher Social Security receipts), and federal outlays grew at an annual rate of 7.1%.

Reagan's administration was the only one to have not raised the minimum wage until Donald Trump's first term.

Along with these, Reagan reappointed Paul Volcker as Chairman of the Federal Reserve, as well as the monetarist Alan Greenspan to succeed him in 1987. He preserved the core New Deal safeguards, such as the United States Securities and Exchange Commission (SEC), Federal Deposit Insurance Corporation (FDIC), the GI Bill and Social Security, while rolling back what he viewed as the excesses of 1960s and 1970s liberal policies.

These policies were labeled by some as "trickle-down economics", though others argue that the combination of significant tax cuts and a massive increase in Cold War related defense spending resulted in large budget deficits, an expansion in the U.S. trade deficit, as well as the stock market crash of 1987, while also contributing to the Savings and Loan crisis. The ultimate cost of the Savings and Loan crisis is estimated to have totaled around US$150 billion, about $125 billion of which was consequently and directly subsidized by the U.S. government. John Kenneth Galbraith called it "the largest and costliest venture in public misfeasance, malfeasance and larceny of all time".

In order to cover new federal budget deficits, the United States borrowed heavily both domestically and abroad, raising the national debt from $997 billion to $2.85 trillion, and the United States moved from being the world's largest international creditor to the world's largest debtor nation. Reagan described the new debt as the "greatest disappointment" of his presidency.

Reagan's support for an increased defense budget at the height of the Cold War was supported by Congressional Democrats and Republicans. However, Congress was reluctant to follow Reagan's proposed cuts in domestic programs. In accordance with Reagan's less-government intervention views, many domestic government programs were cut or experienced periods of reduced funding during his presidency. These included Social Security, Medicaid, Food Stamps, and federal education programs. Though Reagan protected entitlement programs, such as Social Security and Medicare, in one of the most widely criticized actions of the administration, the administration attempted to purge tens of thousands of allegedly disabled people from the Social Security disability roles, who the administration alleged were not truly disabled. Funding for government organizations, including the Environmental Protection Agency, were also reduced. He cut the EPA's budget by 22%, and his director of the EPA, Anne M. Burford, resigned over alleged mismanagement of funds. Tax breaks and increased military spending created a larger budget deficit, which led Reagan to approve two tax increases, aiming to preserve funding for Social Security. By 1988, it was reported that funding for the social safety net was down by 6 percent compared to two years prior.

Speaking of Reagan himself, Donald Regan, the President's former Secretary of the Treasury, and later Chief of Staff, criticized him for his lack of understanding economics: "In the four years that I served as Secretary of the Treasury, I never saw President Reagan alone and never discussed economic philosophy or fiscal and monetary policy with him one-on-one. … The President never told me what he believed or what he wanted to accomplish in the field of economics." However, Reagan's chief economic adviser Martin Feldstein, argued the opposite: "I briefed him on Third World debt; he didn't take notes, he asked very few questions. … The subject came up in a cabinet meeting and he summarized what he had heard perfectly. He had a remarkably good memory for oral presentation and could fit information into his own philosophy and make decisions on it."

=== Oil policy ===
At the beginning of his presidency, Reagan ended the price controls on domestic oil which had been started by Richard Nixon; they had contributed to both the 1973 Oil Crisis and the 1979 Energy Crisis. The price of oil subsequently dropped, and the 1980s did not see the gasoline lines and fuel shortages that the 1970s had. Reagan also attempted to make good on his 1980 campaign promise to repeal the "Windfall Profit Tax" that Carter and Congress enacted in 1980 on domestic oil production; he was able to do so in 1988, when Congress agreed that it had increased dependence on foreign oil. The tax was not a tax on profits, but an excise tax on the difference between a statutory "base price" and the market price. Reagan also stopped aggressive pushing of new auto efficiency standards by the Carter administration, descended on alternative energy researches started by Carter administration.

=== Legacy ===
Some economists believe that Reagan's tax policies invigorated America's economy. For instance, Nobel Prize winner Milton Friedman wrote that the Reagan tax cuts were "one of the most important factors in the boom of the 1990s". Similarly, fellow Nobel Prize–winning economist Robert A. Mundell wrote that the tax cuts made the U.S. economy the motor for the world economy in the 1990s, on which the great revolution in information technology was able to feed.

Other economists argue that the deficits slowed economic growth during the following administration and was the reason that Reagan's successor, George H. W. Bush, reneged on a campaign promise and raised taxes. Nobel Prize–winning economist Robert Solow stated, "As for Reagan being responsible [for the 1990s boom], that's far-fetched. What we got in the Reagan years was a deep recession and then half a dozen years of fine growth as we climbed out of the recession, but nothing beyond that.

Another Reagan legacy was the expansion of the alternative minimum tax. When Ronald Reagan signed the Tax Reform Act of 1986, the AMT was expanded to target middle class deductions related to having children, owning a home, or living in high tax states. In 2006, the IRS's National Taxpayer Advocate's report highlighted the AMT as the single most serious problem with the tax code. The advocate noted that the complexity of the AMT leads to most taxpayers who owe AMT not realizing it until preparing their returns or being notified by the IRS.

== Environment ==
Reagan dismissed proposals to halt acid rain finding them burdensome to industry. The Environmental Protection Agency made a major budget commitment to reduce acid rain; Reagan rejected the proposal and deemed it as wasteful government spending. He also questioned scientific evidence on the causes of acid rain. It was later discovered that the administration was releasing Superfund grants for cleaning up local toxic waste sites to enhance the election prospects of local officials aligned with the Republican Party. Reagan rarely thought about the environment in political terms, however, and did not fear that his popularity would be damaged by environmental issues. In 1986, Reagan removed the solar panels that his predecessor Carter had installed on the roof of the White House's West Wing, citing a damaged roof. In "Global Warming", the author Natalie Goldstein wrote, "Reagan's political philosophy viewed the free market as the best arbiter of what was good for the country. Corporate self-interest, he felt, would steer the country in the right direction."

On January 14, 1983, Reagan vetoed a bill that would created new wilderness areas in Florida.

On November 7, 1986, Reagan vetoed a bill to strengthen the Clean Water Act. Congress didn't take action on this because it was adjourned.

Reagan also vetoed the Water Quality Act of 1987. Congress later overrode it.

On November 2, 1988, Reagan vetoed a bill that would have protected over a million acres in Montana.

The HUD controversy involved administration staffers granting federal funding to constituents, and defrauding the U.S. government out of money intended for low income housing. It resulted in six convictions, including James G. Watt, Reagan's Secretary of the Interior. Watt was indicted on 24 felony counts and pleaded guilty to a single misdemeanor. He was sentenced to five years probation, and ordered to pay a $5000 fine.

== Unions and corporations ==
The Reagan Administration had some of the highest illegal union firings in recorded history.

In 1981, to protect domestic auto sales the Reagan administration signed an agreement with Japan that it would not import more than 1.67 million cars into the United States, which would be one in four cars sold in America.

=== PATCO: Air traffic controllers' strike ===
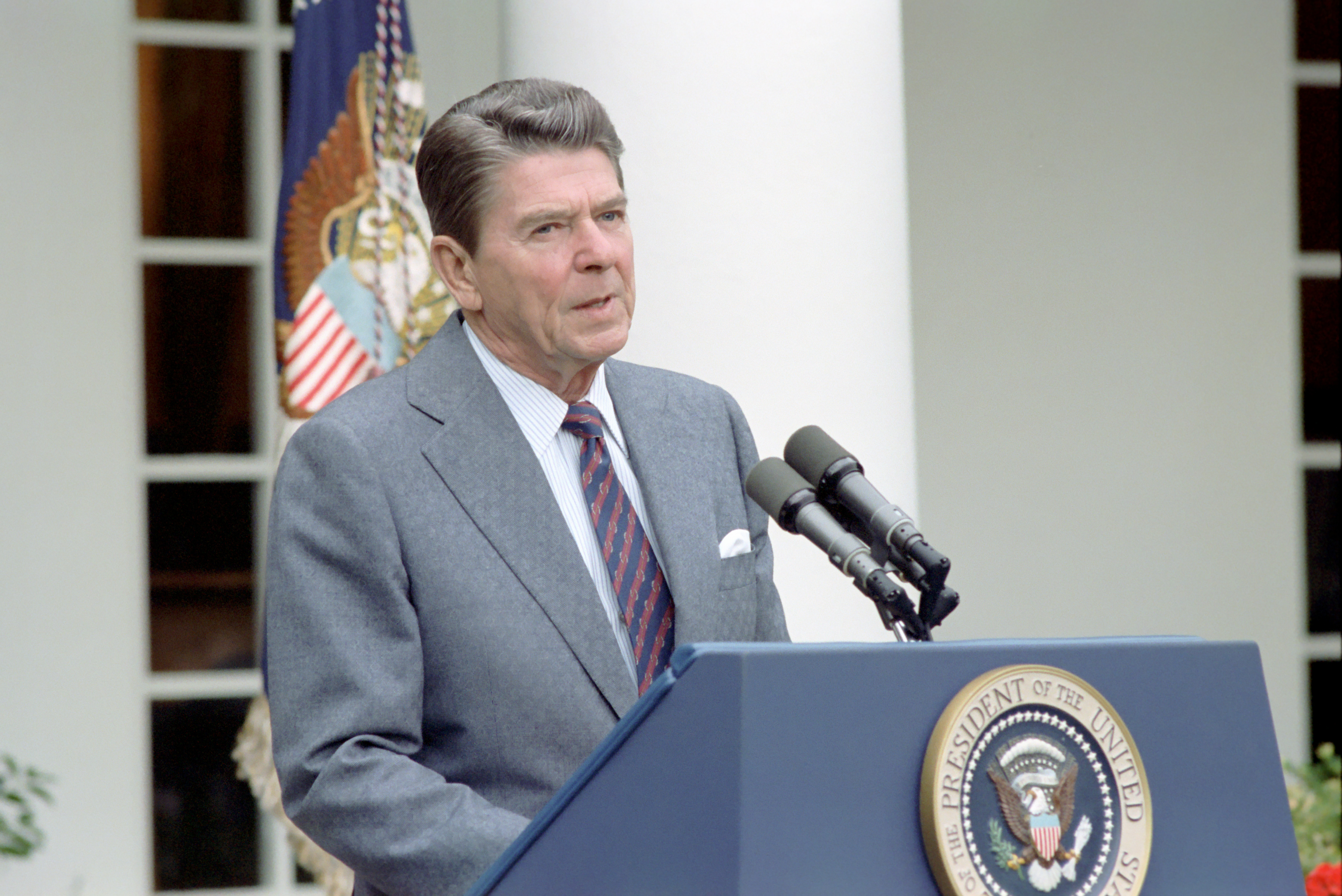
President Reagan speaks about the strike during a press conference in the White House Rose Garden. Reagan fired 11,345 strikers who did not return to work.

Reagan announced that the situation had become an emergency as described in the 1947 Taft Hartley Act, and held a press conference on August 3, 1981 in the White House Rose Garden regarding the strike. Reagan stated that if the air traffic controllers "do not report for work within 48 hours, they have forfeited their jobs and will be terminated."

Two days later, on August 5, Reagan fired 11,359 striking air traffic controllers who had ignored his order to return to work, notwithstanding the fact that the strike was illegal under federal law. The breaking of the strike had a significant impact on labor-management relations in the private sector. Although private employers nominally had the right to permanently replace striking workers under the National Labor Relations Act, that option was rarely used prior to 1981, but much more frequently thereafter. Reagan's actions essentially broke the striking union.

=== Noise Rules ===
In 1981, the Reagan administration changed the rules regarding how to monitor the noise level on a job site.

== Military ==
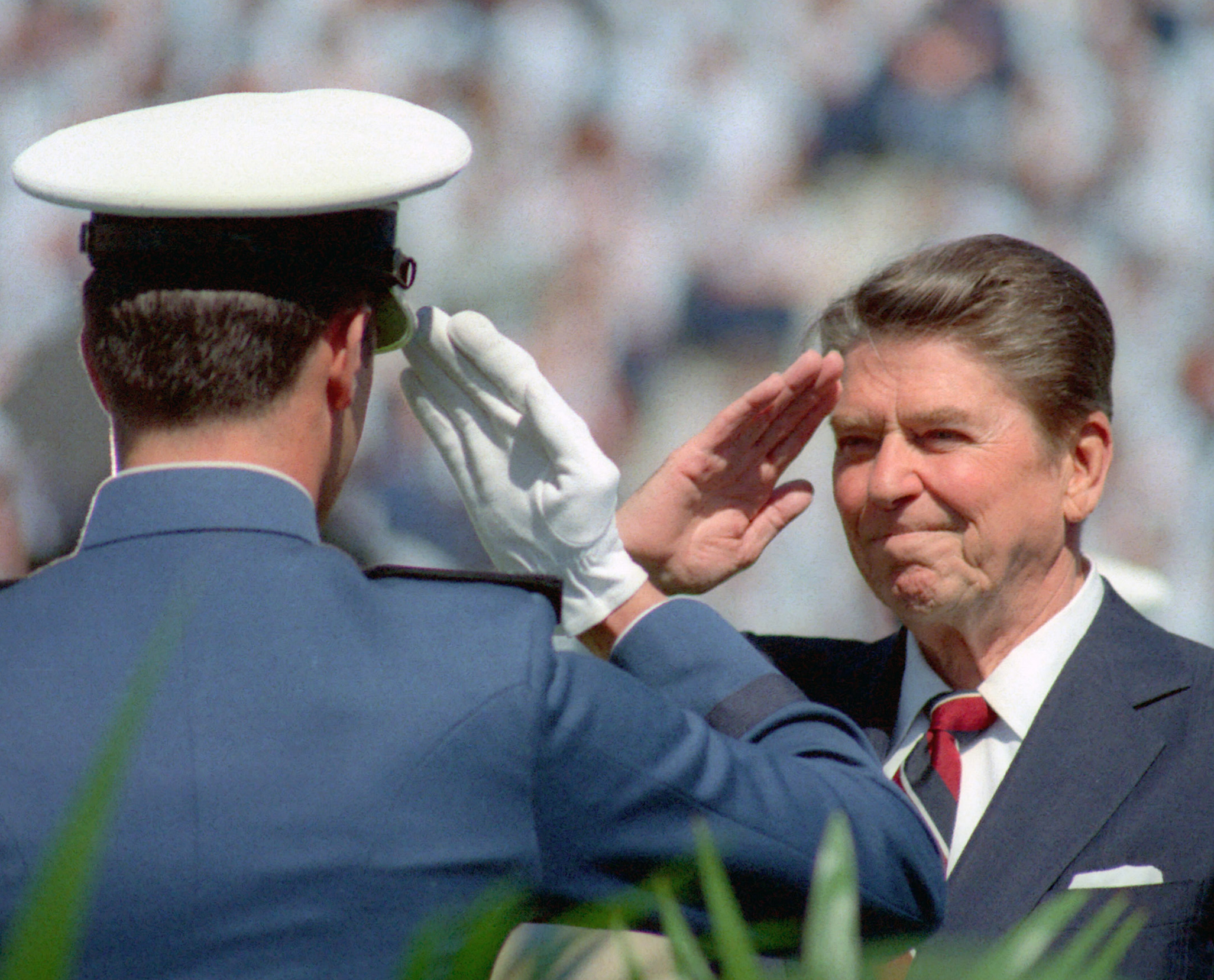
Reagan salutes a military cadet

Reagan sharply accelerated the massive military buildup started by the Carter administration in response to the Soviet intervention in Afghanistan. This buildup, a 40% real increase in defense spending, included the revival of the B-1 bomber program, which had been cancelled by the Carter administration; the deployment of Pershing II missiles in West Germany; the increased enlistment of thousands of troops; and a more advanced intelligence system.

By 1987, the military budget under Reagan's tenure was $456.5 billion, compared to $325.1 billion in 1980.

=== Strategic Defense Initiative ===
In 1983, Reagan introduced the Strategic Defense Initiative (SDI), a defense project. The intended goal was to make the US invulnerable to a Soviet missile attack by placing missiles in space and vaporizing those of the Soviets, upon a nuclear attack. This would be done by a laser guidance system, which grew into a series of systems that turned into a layered ballistic missile defense. Dubbed "Star Wars" by the news media, many wondered if the technological objective was attainable. Following air defense laser testing in 1973, work continued throughout the 1980s, and the first above earth laser intercept test was completed.

== The arts ==
Though Ronald and Nancy Reagan were both former actors and he had served as president of the Screen Actor's Guild, his administration had a curiously mixed record on support for the arts. Via a 1982 Executive Order, President Reagan established the President's Committee on the Arts and Humanities. In each year of his presidency (except for the fiscal years of 1982 and 1986), Congress staved off the Administration's efforts to cut federal expenditures for arts programs such as the National Endowment for the Arts. In a 1983 speech he declared, "We support the National Endowment for the Arts to stimulate excellence and make art more available to more of our people", yet throughout his administration, beginning with an early threat to cut the Carter-era arts budget in half, Reagan's economic and social agendas put him at odds, often contentiously, with artists and arts communities nationwide.

== Education ==
Reagan's philosophy of minimal government intervention in personal and family affairs was reflected in his view of the Federal Department of Education. During the 1980 presidential campaign, Gov. Reagan called for the total elimination of the U.S. Department of Education, severe curtailment of bilingual education, and massive cutbacks in the federal role in education. When Reagan was elected in 1980, the federal share of total education spending was 12 percent. When he left office in 1988 it stood at just 6 percent.

Reagan's policies led to millions dropping out of the federal program for school lunches.

In 1982, the Reagan administration attempted to give the same tax exempt status to racially segregated schools as enjoyed by other private schools, although this was stopped by the courts.

In August 1983, Reagan vetoed a bill that would have allocated 20 million to help desegregate schools in Chicago. He said that he did so "based upon my conviction that the Constitution and its process of separated powers and checks and balances does not permit the judiciary to determine spending priorities or to reallocate funds appropriated by Congress."

Reagan established the National Commission on Excellence in Education, whose inaugural meeting occurred in October 1981. The Final Report of the Commission, which was returned on April 26, 1983, noted the almost uninterrupted decline in student achievement in standardized test scores during the previous two decades, decades in which the Federal presence in education grew. High school graduates in the early 1980s scored almost 40 points below their 1963 counterparts on standard mathematical tests and 50 points lower on verbal tests. About 13 percent of 17-year-olds were considered functionally illiterate, and for minority youth, the figure was estimated to be as high as 40 percent. Remedial math courses then comprised one-fourth of all the math courses that are taught in public 4-year colleges. Reagan felt that Americans could not afford to pass students who fail to learn from one grade to the next simply because they've come to the end of the year, and that they could not afford to waste the valuable resources of higher education to remedy problems that were ignored in elementary and high schools. Four-fifths of American 17-year-olds could not write a persuasive essay. Two-thirds could not solve mathematical problems involving more than one step, and nearly 40 percent could not draw inferences from reading.

An intermittent series of Radio Address to the Nation on Education were a signature of President Reagan. In September 1988, he reported on his administration's success that "Test scores are up, reversing a calamitous drop in scores over the years between 1963 and 1980. Attendance is up, and the number of kids who drop out of high school is down", and stressed that the bounty of Western civilization was owed to American children. He suggested that the report entitled James Madison Elementary School, produced by Education Secretary Bill Bennett, be used to influence curricula at schools across the nation.

== War on drugs ==
Not long after being sworn into office, Reagan declared more militant policies in the "war on drugs". He promised a "planned, concerted campaign" against all drugs, eventually leading to decreases in adolescent drug use in America.

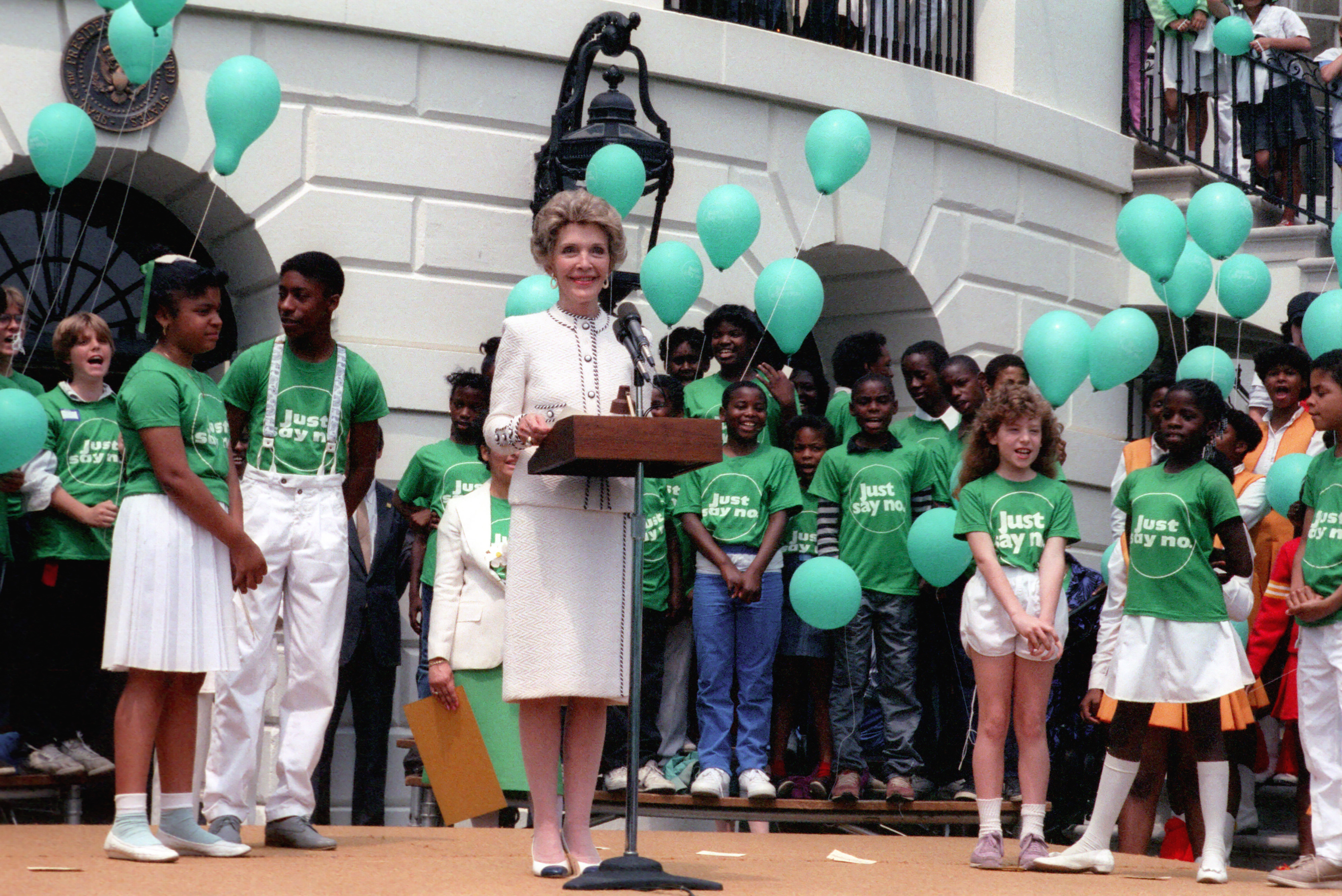
First Lady Nancy Reagan at a Just Say No rally at the White House

President Reagan signed the Anti-Drug Abuse Act of 1986 which granted $1.7 billion to fight drugs, and ensured a mandatory minimum penalty for drug offenses. The bill was criticized for promoting significant racial disparities in the prison population, however, because of the differences in sentencing for crack versus powder cocaine.

Critics also charged that the administration's policies did little to actually reduce the availability of drugs or crime on the street, while resulting in a great financial and human cost for American society. Supporters argued that the numbers for adolescent drug users declined during Reagan's years in office.

As a part of the administration's effort, Reagan's First Lady, Nancy, made the war on drugs her main cause as First Lady, by founding the "Just Say No" drug awareness campaign. As of 2007, there were still hundreds of "Just Say No" clinics and school clubs in operation around the country aimed at helping and rehabilitating children and teenagers with drug problems. The program demonstrated to children various ways of refusing drugs and alcohol.

== Judiciary ==
Reagan nominated Sandra Day O'Connor to fill the Supreme Court Justice vacancy left by the retirement of Justice Potter Stewart, as he had promised during his 1980 presidential campaign. Sandra Day O'Connor was a conservative Republican and strict constructionist. Though the far-right of the Republican Party was dissatisfied by O'Connor, who refused to condemn the Roe v. Wade decision and had supported the federal Equal Rights Amendment, Senate Republicans and the vast majority of Americans approved of the pick, the Senate confirming her unanimously. O'Connor would later take more moderate positions.

In 1986, during his second term, the president elevated Justice William Rehnquist to succeed outgoing Chief Justice Warren Burger and named Antonin Scalia to occupy the seat left by Rehnquist.

In 1987, when Associate Justice Lewis Powell retired, Reagan nominated conservative jurist Robert Bork to the high court. Within 45 minutes of Bork's nomination to the Court, Ted Kennedy (D-MA) took to the Senate floor with a strong condemnation of Bork in a nationally televised speech, declaring,

Robert Bork's America is a land in which women would be forced into back-alley abortions, blacks would sit at segregated lunch counters, rogue police could break down citizens' doors in midnight raids, schoolchildren could not be taught about evolution, writers and artists could be censored at the whim of the Government, and the doors of the Federal courts would be shut on the fingers of millions of citizens.

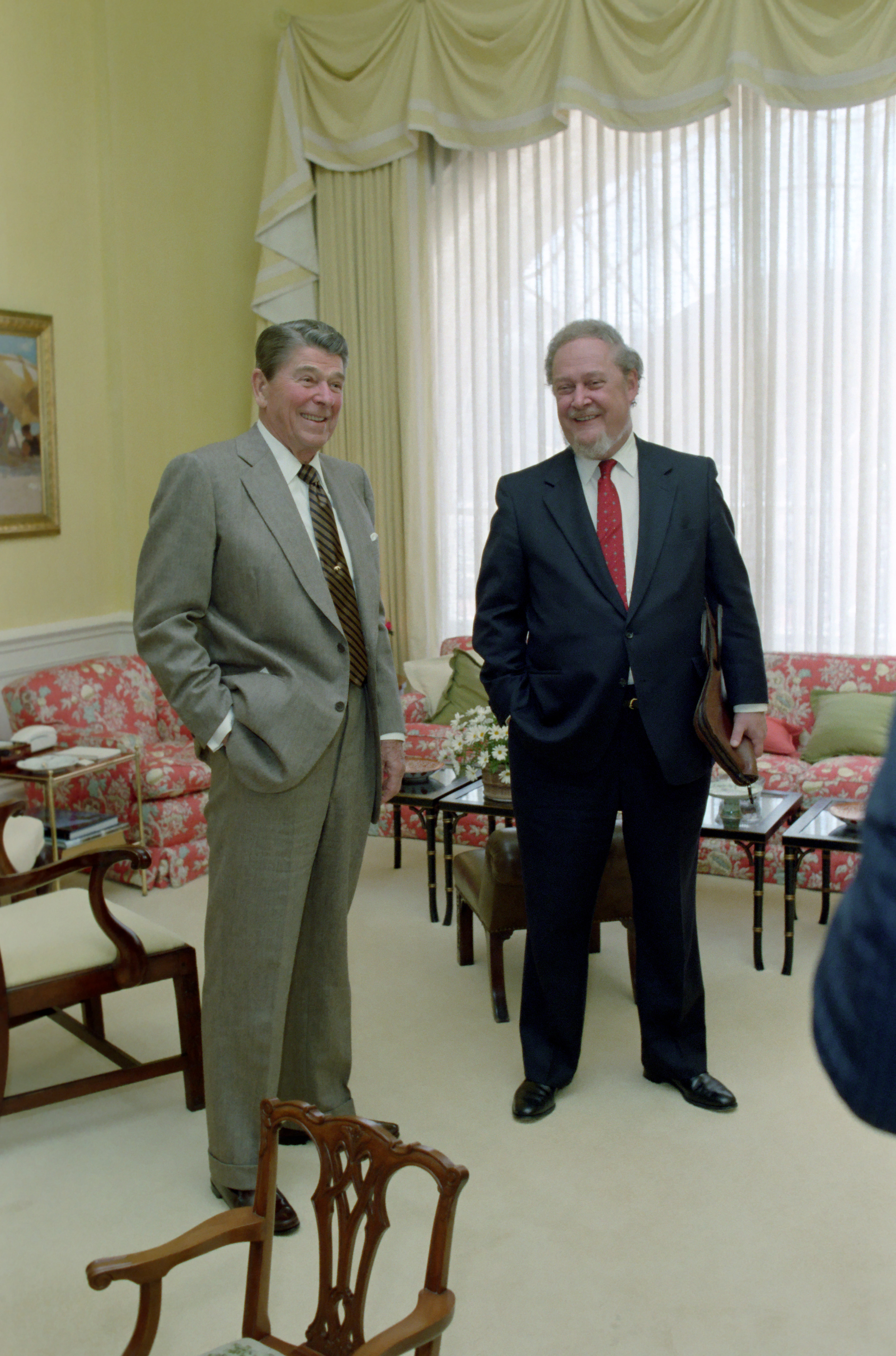
Reagan in the White House private quarters with Robert Bork

The rapid response of Kennedy's "Robert Bork's America" speech stunned the Reagan White House; though conservatives considered Kennedy's accusations slanderous ideological smears on a well qualified candidate for the bench, the attacks went unanswered for two and a half months. Bork refused to withdraw himself and his nomination was rejected 58–42. Anthony Kennedy was eventually confirmed in his place.

Reagan also nominated a large number of judges to the United States district court and United States court of appeals benches; most of these nominations were not controversial, although a handful of candidates were singled out for criticism by civil rights advocates and other liberal critics, resulting in occasional confirmation fights. Both his Supreme Court nominations and his lower court appointments were in line with Reagan's express philosophy that judges should interpret law as enacted and not "legislate from the bench". By the end of the 1980s, a conservative majority on the Supreme Court had put an end to the perceived "activist" trend begun under the leadership of Chief Justice Earl Warren. General adherence to the principle of stare decisis, along with minority support, left most of the major landmark case decisions (such as Brown, Miranda, and Roe v. Wade) of the previous three decades still standing as binding precedent.

Reagan appointed 83 judges to the United States Courts of Appeals, and 290 judges to the United States district courts. His total of 376 appointments is the most by any president. Reagan appointed many leading conservative academics to the intermediate United States Courts of Appeals, including Bork, Ralph K. Winter, Jr., Richard Posner, and Frank Easterbrook. However, he also experienced a number of judicial appointment controversies, as nine nominees for various federal appellate judgeships were not confirmed. In some cases, the nominations were not processed by the Democratic-controlled Senate Judiciary Committee before Reagan's presidency ended, while in other cases, nominees were rejected by the Senate Judiciary Committee or even blocked by unfriendly members of the Republican Party.

== Response to AIDS ==
Ronald Reagan has been criticized for a perceived silence about the AIDS epidemic in the 1980s. Although AIDS was first identified in 1981, Reagan did not mention it publicly for several more years, notably during a press conference in 1985 and several speeches in 1987. During the press conference in 1985, Reagan expressed skepticism in allowing children with AIDS to continue in school although he supported their right to do so, stating:

I can well understand the plight of the parents and how they feel about it. I also have compassion, as I think we all do, for the child that has this and doesn't know and can't have it explained to him why somehow he is now an outcast and can no longer associate with his playmates and schoolmates. On the other hand, I can understand the problem with the parents. It is true that some medical sources had said that this cannot be communicated in any way other than the ones we already know and which would not involve a child being in the school. And yet medicine has not come forth unequivocally and said, This we know for a fact, that it is safe. And until they do, I think we just have to do the best we can with this problem. I can understand both sides of it.

The CDC had previously issued a report stating that "casual person-to-person contact as would occur among school children appears to pose no risk."

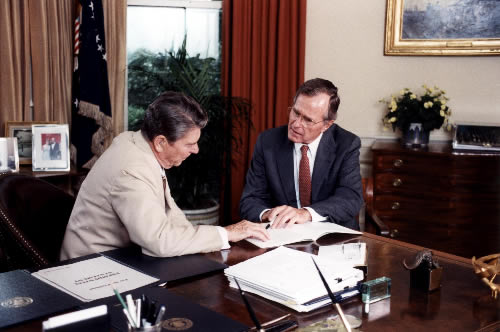
Then-Vice President Bush, right, meets with President Reagan, left, in 1984.

Decades after Reagan's presidency, audio surfaced that revealed Larry Speakes, who was the White House Press Secretary from 1981-1987, gave a dismissive attitude to reporter Lester Kinsolving regarding questions on the AIDS epidemic.

Even with the death from AIDS of his friend Rock Hudson, Reagan was widely criticized for not supporting more active measures to contain the spread of AIDS. Until celebrities, first Joan Rivers and soon afterwards Elizabeth Taylor, spoke out publicly about the increasing number of people quickly dying from this new disease, most public officials and celebrities were too afraid of dealing with this subject.

Reagan prevented his Surgeon General, C. Everett Koop, from speaking out about the AIDS epidemic. When in 1986 Reagan was highly encouraged by many other public officials to authorize Koop to issue a report on the epidemic, he expected it to be in line with conservative policies; instead, Koop's Surgeon General's Report on Acquired Immune Deficiency Syndrome greatly emphasized the importance of a comprehensive AIDS education strategy, including widespread distribution of condoms, and rejected mandatory testing. This approach brought Koop into conflict with other administration officials such as Education Secretary William Bennett. In 1988, Koop took the unprecedented action of mailing AIDS information to every U.S. household. This information included the use of condoms as the decisive defense against contracting the disease.

Social action groups such as ACT UP worked to raise awareness of the AIDS problem. Because of ACT UP, in 1987, Reagan responded by appointing the Watkins Commission on AIDS, which was succeeded by a permanent advisory council.

Supporters of Reagan past and present have pointed out the fact that he declared in the aforementioned September 1985 press conference that he wanted from Congress massive government research effort against AIDS similar to one President Nixon had overseen against cancer. Reagan said, "It's been one of the top priorities with us, and over the last 4 years, and including what we have in the budget for '86, it will amount to over a half a billion dollars that we have provided for research on AIDS in addition to what I'm sure other medical groups are doing." He also remarked, "Yes, there's no question about the seriousness of this and the need to find an answer." Annual AIDS related funding was $44 million in 1983, 2 years after he took office, and was $1.6 billion in 1988, an increase of over 3,600 percent.

== Gay rights ==
No civil rights legislation for lesbian or gay individuals passed during Reagan's tenure. On the 1980 campaign trail, he spoke of the gay civil rights movement: "My criticism is that the gay movement isn't just asking for civil rights; it's asking for recognition and acceptance of an alternative lifestyle which I do not believe society can condone, nor can I."

== Civil rights ==
Reagan opposed the Civil Rights Act of 1964 and the Voting Rights Act of 1965 signed into law by President Lyndon B. Johnson.

Reagan gave a states' rights speech at the Neshoba County Fair in Philadelphia, Mississippi, the town where the murders of Chaney, Goodman, and Schwerner occurred in 1964, when running for president in 1980 (many politicians had spoken at that annual fair, however). Reagan was offended that some accused him of racism. In 1980 Reagan said the Voting Rights Act was "humiliating to the South", although he later supported extending the act. He opposed Fair Housing legislation in California (the Rumford Fair Housing Act), but in 1988 signed a law expanding the Fair Housing Act of 1968. Reagan was unsuccessful in trying to veto another civil rights bill in March of the same year. At first Reagan opposed the Martin Luther King holiday, and signed it only after an overwhelming veto-proof majority (338 to 90 in the House of Representatives and 78 to 22 in the Senate) voted in favor of it. Congress overrode Reagan's veto of the Civil Rights Restoration Act of 1987. Reagan said the Restoration Act would impose too many regulations on churches, the private sector and state and local governments.

However, President Reagan established the White House Initiative on Historically Black Colleges and Universities to increase African-American participation in federal education programs and on June 29, 1982, he signed a 25-year extension of 1965 Voting Rights Act.

== Further sources ==
- Appleby, Joyce; Alan Brinkley; James M. McPherson (2003). The American Journey. Woodland Hills, California: Glencoe/McGraw-Hill. ISBN 0-07-824129-4.
- Boskin, Michael J. (1987). Reagan and the US Economy: The Successes, Failures, and Unfinished Agenda. ICEG.
- Cannon, Lou; Michael Beschloss (2001). Ronald Reagan: The Presidential Portfolio: A History Illustrated from the Collection of the Ronald Reagan Library and Museum. PublicAffairs. ISBN 1-891620-84-3.
- Komlos, John (2018). "Reaganomics: A Watershed Moment on the Road to Trumpism" (PDF). CESifo Working Papers. 16. doi:10.1515/ev-2018-0032. S2CID 159222280.
- Niskanen, William A. (1988). Reaganomics: An Insider's Account of the Policies and the People. Oxford, England: Oxford University Press. ISBN 978-0-19-505394-4.
- Shilts, Randy (2005). Conduct Unbecoming: Gays and Lesbians in the U.S. Military. St. Martin's Griffin. ISBN 0-312-34264-0.
- Wojciech, Bienkowski; Brada, Josef C.; Radlo, Mariusz-Jan, eds. (2006). Reaganomics Goes Global: What Can the EU, Russia and Transition Countries Learn from the USA?. Palgrave Macmillan. ISBN 978-1-4039-9941-2.
