= 2025 South African Budget =

The 2025 South African Budget, presented by Minister of Finance Enoch Godongwana on 12 March 2025, introduced several fiscal measures aimed at stabilising government finances and addressing economic challenges. Key proposals included a phased increase in the value-added tax (VAT) rate, adjustments to personal income tax, and increased allocations to healthcare and defence.

== Background ==
Originally scheduled for 19 February 2025, the budget was postponed due to disagreements within the Government of National Unity, particularly over a proposed two-percentage-point VAT increase. In the revised budget, the minister proposed a more gradual approach: a 0.5 percentage point increase effective 1 May 2025 and another 0.5 percentage point increase on 1 April 2026, which would raise the VAT rate from 15% to 16% over two years.

== Revenue measures ==
Several revenue-enhancing measures were introduced:

- VAT – The phased increase is expected to generate approximately R13.5 billion in additional revenue during 2025.
- Personal income tax – Tax brackets and credits were not adjusted for inflation, resulting in increased effective taxation through fiscal drag.
- Excise duties – Increases above the rate of inflation were applied to alcohol and tobacco products.
- Carbon tax – The rate increased from R190 to R236 per tonne of carbon dioxide equivalent as of 1 January 2025.
- VAT rate reversal - South African Ministry of Finance confirmed on 24 April 2025 that the VAT rate would remain at 15%, effective 1 May 2025.

== Expenditure allocations ==
The budget increased funding to key service areas:

- Health – R28.9 billion was allocated to support healthcare, including expanded HIV treatment programmes.
- Defence – R5 billion was allocated to strengthen military capacity in light of regional instability.
- Social grants – Grants were increased, with old age and disability grants raised to R2,315 and child support grants to R560.

== Political response and legal challenges ==
The proposed VAT increase faced significant opposition within the ruling coalition. The Democratic Alliance publicly opposed the increase, citing its disproportionate impact on lower-income households. The party also launched a legal challenge questioning the budget’s procedural legality.

In light of mounting resistance, reports suggested that the African National Congress may reconsider the VAT hike.

== Economic context ==
Despite the political friction, tax revenue for 2024/25 increased by over 6%, reaching R1.855 trillion. However, the economy continues to face challenges, including high unemployment, constrained electricity supply, and a fragile investment climate.
