= Trickle-down economics =

Economic and political term

Ronald Reagan's economic policies, dubbed "Reaganomics" by opponents, included large tax cuts and were characterized as trickle-down economics. Here, he outlines his plan for the Economic Recovery Tax Act of 1981 from the Oval Office in a televised address, July 1981.

Trickle-down economics, also known as trickle-down theory and the horse-and-sparrow theory, is a term used to describe government economic policies that disproportionately favor the upper tier of the economic spectrum (wealthy individuals and large corporations). The term has been used broadly by critics of supply-side economics to refer to taxing and spending policies by governments that, intentionally or not, result in widening income inequality; it has also been used in critical references to neoliberalism. These critics reject the notion that spending by this elite group would "trickle down" to those who are less fortunate and lead to economic growth that will eventually benefit the economy as a whole.

While criticisms have existed since at least the 19th century, the term "trickle-down economics" was popularized by Democrats in the US to derogate Reaganomics and its reduction in the top marginal tax rates.

Major examples of what critics have called "trickle-down economics" in the US include the Reagan tax cuts, the Bush tax cuts, and in the UK include Margaret Thatcher's economic policies in the 1980s and Liz Truss's mini-budget tax cuts of 2022.

== History ==
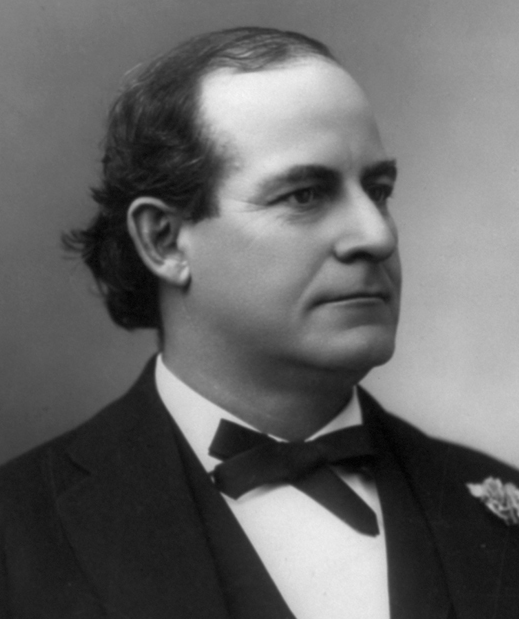
William Jennings Bryan used a similar phrasing ("leak through") to characterize his opponents who supported the gold standard in his Cross of Gold speech in 1896.

In 1896, United States Democratic presidential candidate William Jennings Bryan claimed in his Cross of Gold speech that his opposition based their policies on the idea that the success of the rich would "leak through" to the lower classes, stating: "There are those who believe that, if you will only legislate to make the well-to-do prosperous, their prosperity will leak through on those below."

In 1932, humorist and social commentator Will Rogers wrote a column criticizing Herbert Hoover's policies and approach to The Great Depression and stated: "The money was all appropriated for the top in the hopes that it would trickle down to the needy. Mr. Hoover was an engineer. He knew that water trickles down. Put it uphill and let it go and it will reach the driest little spot." In 2007, political commentator William J. Bennett credited Rogers for coining the term "trickle down" and observed its persistent use throughout the decades since.

In 1983, H. W. Arndt wrote that Indian nationalist and statesman Jawaharlal Nehru may have been the first to use the term in an economic (rather than political context) when he stated in 1933 "the exploitation of India and other countries brought so much wealth to England that some of it trickled down to the working class and their standard of living rose."

Samuel Rosenman, a Democratic presidential speechwriter under Franklin D. Roosevelt and Harry Truman, and coiner of the term "New Deal", wrote that "trickle down policies" had been prevalent in American government since 1921. In 1969, after leaving the presidency, Democrat Lyndon B. Johnson alleged "Republicans ... simply don't know how to manage the economy. They're so busy operating the trickle-down theory, giving the richest corporations the biggest break, that the whole thing goes to hell in a handbasket."

Ronald Reagan launched his 1980 campaign for the presidency on a platform advocating for supply-side economics. During the 1980 Republican Party presidential primaries, George H. W. Bush had derided Reagan's economic approach as "voodoo economics". Following Reagan's election, the "trickle-down" reached wide circulation with the publication of "The Education of David Stockman", a December 1981 interview of Reagan's incoming Office of Management and Budget director David Stockman, in the magazine Atlantic Monthly. In the interview, Stockman expressed doubts about supply side economics, telling journalist William Greider that the Kemp–Roth Tax Cut was a way to rebrand a tax cut for the top income bracket to make it easier to pass into law. Stockman said that "It's kind of hard to sell 'trickle down,' so the supply-side formula was the only way to get a tax policy that was really 'trickle down.' Supply-side is 'trickle-down' theory." Reagan administration officials including Michael Deaver wanted Stockman to be fired in response to his comments, but he was ultimately kept on in exchange for a private apology. Political opponents of the Reagan administration soon seized on this language in an effort to brand the administration as caring only about the wealthy. In 1982, John Kenneth Galbraith wrote the "trickle-down economics" that Stockman was referring to was previously known under the name "horse-and-sparrow theory", the idea that feeding a horse a huge amount of oats results in some of the feed passing through for lucky sparrows to eat.

In the 1992 presidential election, independent candidate Ross Perot also referred to trickle-down economics as "political voodoo". In the same election, during a presidential town hall debate, Bill Clinton, referring to the previous presidencies of Ronald Reagan and George H. W. Bush stated "...we've had 12 years of trickle-down economics. We've gone from first to twelfth in the world in wages. We've had four years where we've produced no private-sector jobs. Most people are working harder for less money than they were making 10 years ago".

== Usage and reception ==
In 1983, H. W. Arndt described the term as a myth, saying that no major economists of the 1950s assumed that wealth would accumulate among the rich and then spread to the poor.

Author and political commentator William Safire, in his political dictionary published in 2008, defined "trickle-down theory" as "The idea that aid to corporations will seep through to employees and irrigate the economy."

Thomas Sowell, a proponent of supply-side economics, says that trickle-down economics have never been advocated by any economist, writing in his 2012 essay "Trickle Down" Theory and "Tax Cuts for the Rich" that "[t]he 'trickle-down' theory cannot be found in even the most voluminous scholarly studies of economic theories." Sowell disagrees with the characterization of supply-side economics as trickle-down, saying that the economic theory of reducing marginal tax rates works in precisely the opposite direction: "Workers are always paid first and then profits flow upward later – if at all." In 2014, Sowell called trickle-down economics the "biggest lie in politics," and said "The time is long overdue for people to ask themselves why it is necessary for those on the left to make up a lie if what they believe in is true."

While the term "trickle-down" is commonly used to refer to income benefits, it is sometimes used to refer to the idea of positive externalities arising from technological innovation or increased trade. Arthur Okun, and separately William Baumol, for example, have used the term to refer to the flow of the benefits of innovation, which do not accrue entirely to the "great entrepreneurs and inventors", but trickle down to the masses. And Nobel laureate economist Paul Romer used the term in reference to the impact on wealth from tariff changes. The Laffer curve is often cited by proponents of trickle-down policy.

Benjamin Lockwood, professor of business economics and public policy at Wharton, said "The term ‘trickle-down economics’ doesn't really represent a cohesive economic theory,” “It's a term used, often negatively, to characterize the view that reducing taxes on the rich will benefit the non-rich.”

The political campaign group, Tax Justice Network has used the term referring broadly to wealth inequality in its criticisms of tax havens. In 2013, Pope Francis used the term in his apostolic exhortation Evangelii gaudium, saying that "Some people continue to defend trickle-down theories which assume that economic growth, encouraged by a free market, will inevitably succeed in bringing about greater justice and inclusiveness in the world."

In New Zealand, Damien O'Connor, an MP from the Labour Party, called trickle-down economics "the rich pissing on the poor" in the Labour Party campaign launch video for the 2011 general election. In a 2016 US presidential election candidates debate, Hillary Clinton accused Donald Trump of supporting the "most extreme" version of trickle-down economics with his tax plan, calling it "trumped-up trickle-down" as a pun on his name. In his speech to a joint session of Congress on April 28, 2021, US President Joe Biden stated that "trickle-down economics has never worked". Biden has continued to be critical of trickle-down.

A Columbia journal article comparing a failed UK Enterprise Zone proposal to later US proposals references them as a form of trickle-down policy where lower regulatory and tax burdens were aimed at wealthier developers with the hope they would benefit residents. Nobel laureate Paul Krugman states that despite the narrative of trickle-down style tax cuts, the effective tax rate of the top 1% of earners has failed to change very much. Political commentator Robert Reich has implicated institutions such as The Heritage Foundation, Cato Institute, and Club for Growth for promoting what he considers to be a discredited idea. Kansas governor and politician Sam Brownback's 2018 tax cut package was widely labelled as an attempt at trickle-down economics. Friedrich Hayek's economic theories have also been described as trickle-down.

In 2022, the Liz Truss administration objected to characterizing its policies as "trickle-down economics".

== Studies and research ==
In 2015, Joseph Stiglitz wrote that in the 1950s and 1960s in industrialized nations, all levels of workers were gaining, with lower income workers experiencing the most gains, political theories of "trickle-down" associated with the "a rising tide lifts all boats" hypothesis were believed. He stated that the data equally supports the ideas of "trickle-up" theory, or "build out from the middle" theory.

In a 2020 research paper, economists David Hope and Julian Limberg analyzed data spanning 50 years from 18 countries, and found that tax cuts for the rich increased inequality in the short and medium term, and had no significant effect on real GDP per capita or employment in the short and medium term. According to the study, this shows that the tax cuts for the upper class did not trickle down to the broader economy. From 1980 to 2016, a divergence in the distribution of wealth was noted, with the top .01% of earners seeing a 600% change in real income, vs a 0% change in the bottom 99%, leading to the top 1% accruing 15% more of the total wealth pool, from a share of 15 to 30%.

A 2015 IMF staff discussion note by Era Dabla-Norris, Kalpana Kochhar, Nujin Suphaphiphat, Frantisek Ricka and Evridiki Tsounta suggests that lowering taxes on the top 20% could actually reduce growth. Political scientists Brainard Guy Peters and Maximilian Lennart Nagel in 2020 described the 'trickle down' description of tax cuts for the wealthy and corporations stimulating economic growth that helps the less affluent as a "zombie idea" and stated that it has been the most enduring failed policy idea in American politics.

== See also ==
- A rising tide lifts all boats – Economical aphorism
- Austerity – Economic policies intended to reduce government budget deficits
- Classical economics – School of thought in economics
- Decoupling of wages from productivity – End of the historical linkage between gross national product and wages
- Economic inequality – Distribution of income or wealth between different groups
- Keynesian economics – Group of macroeconomic theories
- Matthew effect – The rich get richer and the poor get poorer
- Neoclassical economics – Approach to economics
- Palace economy – Type of economic system
