= Reagan era =

Period in the history of the United States, 1981–2009

Reagan Era
- 1980 – see below
New Deal Era - 1964–1980	Post-Cold War Era
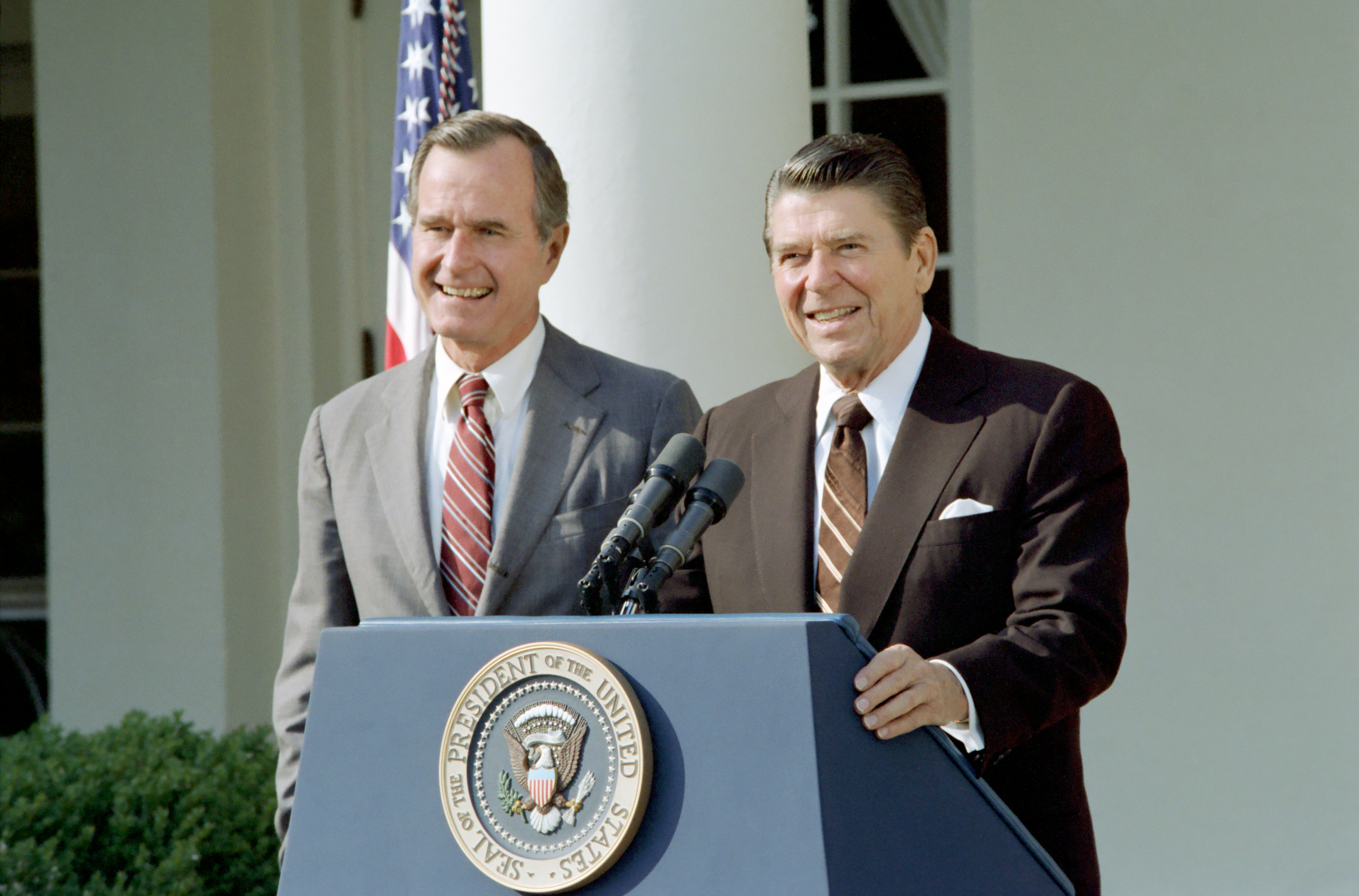
- Ronald Reagan (right) and George H. W. Bush, 1982
- Location: United States
- Including: History of the United States (1980–1991); Post-Cold War Era
- President(s): Ronald Reagan; George H. W. Bush; Bill Clinton; George W. Bush
- Key events: Reaganomics; Iran–Contra affair Invasion of Grenada; Reagan Doctrine; Escalation and end of the Cold War; Invasion of Panama; Gulf War

The Reagan era or the Age of Reagan is a periodization of United States history used by historians and political observers to emphasize that the conservative "Reagan Revolution" led by President Ronald Reagan in domestic and foreign policy had a lasting impact. It overlaps with what political scientists call the Sixth Party System. Definitions of the Reagan era universally include the 1980s and the early 1990s, while more extensive definitions may also include the late 1970s, all of the 1990s, and even up until the late 2000s or the present. In his 2008 book, The Age of Reagan: A History, 1974–2008, historian and journalist Sean Wilentz argues that Reagan dominated this stretch of American history in the same way that Franklin D. Roosevelt and his New Deal legacy dominated the four preceding decades.

The Reagan era included ideas and personalities beyond Reagan himself. He is usually characterized as the leader of a broadly-based conservative movement whose ideas dominated national policy-making in areas such as taxes, welfare, defense, the federal judiciary, and the Cold War. Other major conservative figures and organizations of the Reagan era include Newt Gingrich, William F. Buckley Jr., Pat Buchanan, Jerry Falwell, Phyllis Schlafly and The Heritage Foundation. The Rehnquist Court, inaugurated during Reagan's presidency, handed down several conservative decisions. The Reagan era coincides with the presidency of Reagan, and, in more extensive definitions, the presidencies of Gerald Ford, Jimmy Carter, George H. W. Bush, Bill Clinton, and George W. Bush. Liberals generally lament the Reagan era, while conservatives generally praise it and call for its continuation in the 21st century. However, some liberals were significantly influenced as well, leading to the Third Way.

Upon taking office, the Reagan administration implemented an economic policy based on the theory of supply-side economics. Taxes were reduced through the passage of the Economic Recovery Tax Act of 1981, while the administration also cut domestic spending and increased military spending. Increasing deficits motivated the passage of tax increases during the George H. W. Bush and Clinton administrations, but taxes were cut again with the passage of the Economic Growth and Tax Relief Reconciliation Act of 2001. During Clinton's presidency, Republicans won passage of the Personal Responsibility and Work Opportunity Act, a bill which placed several new limits on those receiving federal assistance.

Campaigning for the Democratic nomination in 2008, Barack Obama interpreted how Reagan changed the nation's trajectory:

I think Ronald Reagan changed the trajectory of America in a way that Richard Nixon did not and in a way that Bill Clinton did not. He put us on a fundamentally different path because the country was ready for it. I think they felt like with all the excesses of the 1960s and 1970s and government had grown and grown but there wasn't much sense of accountability in terms of how it was operating. I think that people . . . he just tapped into what people were already feeling, which was we want clarity, we want optimism, we want a return to that sense of dynamism and entrepreneurship that had been missing.

== Dates ==
Most historians begin the era in 1980, when Reagan was elected president, and usually probe back into the 1970s for the origins of the Reagan era. For example, Kalman (2010) explores multiple crises of the 1970s that eroded confidence in liberal solutions: the rise of the Christian right and the reaction against the gay rights movement, feminism, and the Equal Rights Amendment, grassroots reactions against busing ordered by federal judges, the American defeat in the Vietnam War, the collapse of détente and fears of Soviet power, the challenge of imported cars and textiles, the deindustrialization of the Rust Belt, soaring inflation, stagflation, and the energy crisis, as well as the humiliation the nation suffered during the Iran hostage crisis and the sense of malaise as the nation wondered if its glory days had passed. Kalman shows step by step the process by which one political alternative after another collapsed, leaving Reagan standing.

The term "Reagan era" is often used to refer to the United States only during Reagan's presidency, but it has also taken on an extended meaning that incorporates other periods. The George H. W. Bush presidency (1989–1993), the Clinton presidency (1993–2001), and the George W. Bush presidency (2001–2009) are often treated as extensions of the Reagan era. Wilentz additionally includes the Ford presidency (1974–1977) and the Carter presidency (1977–1981).

The endpoint of the Reagan era is often seen as the election of Democrat Barack Obama in 2008. The sweeping policies pursued by the Obama administration, from same-sex marriage and criminal justice reform to banking regulation and increased government presence in the economy, constituted a clear break with the small government policies and social conservatism of the Reagan era. The 2016 election victory of President Donald Trump has stirred debate over whether his rise signifies the continuation of the Reagan era or represents a paradigm shift for American politics. Political scientist Stephen Skowronek argues that Trump's election shows that the Reagan era continues. Skowronek compares Obama to former presidents like Woodrow Wilson and Richard Nixon, who governed at a time when their own party was generally in the minority at the federal level. Julia Azari, by contrast, argues that Trump's election signifies the end of the Reagan era and the beginning of a new cycle in politics, including Trump's support for protectionism and opposition to support for Ukraine in the Russo-Ukrainian war.

== Rise ==
Wilentz traces the start of the Reagan era to the Watergate scandal, which ended the presidency of Richard Nixon and created an opening for a new Republican leader. Along with the Watergate scandal, the assassination of John F. Kennedy, the Vietnam War, and poor economic conditions created widespread public alienation from political leaders in the mid-1970s. A mass movement of population from the cities to the suburbs led to the creation of a new group of voters less attached to New Deal economic policies and machine politics. Reagan and other conservatives successfully presented conservative ideas as an alternative to a public that had grown disillusioned with New Deal liberalism. Reagan's charisma and speaking skills helped him frame conservatism as an optimistic, forward-looking vision for the country. Reagan challenged Nixon's successor, incumbent President Gerald Ford, in the 1976 Republican presidential primaries. Ford narrowly clinched the nomination at the 1976 Republican National Convention, but he lost the White House to the Democratic nominee, Jimmy Carter.

During his presidency, Carter alienated many of those who had voted for him in 1976, including many in his own party. In the 1980 Democratic primaries, Carter defeated a strong challenge from the left in the form of Senator Ted Kennedy, who had clashed with Carter over the establishment of a national health insurance system. Carter, and the Democratic Party as a whole, also alienated other voters, while the conservative movement gathered strength. A continually poor economy bred frustration over taxes, and voters became increasingly receptive to those advocating for a smaller government. A backlash also developed against affirmative action programs, as some whites claimed that the programs constituted reverse discrimination. The president had won a majority of evangelical Protestant voters in 1976, but the increasingly-politicized Christian right came to strongly oppose his presidency. Many of these religious voters were swayed by the public campaigns of leaders such as Jerry Falwell of the Moral Majority and Phyllis Schlafly, who opposed ratification of the Equal Rights Amendment. Another important conservative organization, The Heritage Foundation, emerged as an important conservative think tank that developed and advocated conservative policies.

With the backing of many in the conservative movement, Reagan defeated establishment favorite George H. W. Bush, moderate Congressman John B. Anderson, and others in the 1980 Republican primaries. To ensure party unity, Reagan named Bush as his running mate at the 1980 Republican National Convention, even though Bush had characterized Reagan's supply-side economics as "voodoo economics". Reagan mobilized his base by campaigning on his conservative positions, while the Carter campaign sought to portray Reagan as a dangerous extremist. An improving economy helped Carter overtake Reagan in the October polling, but Reagan won a decisive victory in an October 28 debate. On election day, Reagan narrowly won a majority in the popular vote but took the electoral vote by a wide margin, carrying 44 states. In the concurrent congressional elections, Republicans won several seats in the House of Representatives and took control of the Senate for the first time since the 1950s.

== Reagan's presidency ==
Upon taking office, Reagan argued that the United States faced a dire crisis, and that the best way to address this crisis was through conservative reforms. His major policy priorities were increasing military spending, cutting taxes, reducing non-military federal spending, and restricting federal regulations. Reagan believed that reducing the role of the government would lead to increased economic growth, which in turn would lead to higher revenues that would help pay down the national debt. Working with Congressman Jack Kemp, the Reagan administration introduced a major tax cut bill that won the support of enough Republicans and conservative Democrats to pass both houses of Congress. In August 1981, Reagan signed the Economic Recovery Tax Act of 1981, which enacted a 27% across-the-board federal income tax cut over three years, as well as a separate bill that reduced federal spending, especially in anti-poverty programs.

A recession in the early part of Reagan's term, combined with tax cuts and increased military spending, led to an increasing deficit. Democrats won several seats in the House of Representatives in the 1982 mid-term elections. Reagan's approval ratings fell to 35%, and many Democrats believed that their party could defeat Reagan in the 1984 presidential election and roll back some of the Reagan administration policies. A strong economic recovery that began in 1983 boosted Reagan's approval ratings, and the administration argued that the tax cuts had been the primary factor in turning the economy around. In the 1984 presidential election, Reagan won his party's re-nomination without facing a serious challenge, while former Vice President Walter Mondale won the Democratic nomination. On election day, Reagan won 59% of the popular vote and carried 49 states, leading to speculation of a permanent realignment in U.S. politics towards the Republican Party.

Despite his re-election, Reagan faced significantly more difficulties in enacting conservative policies in his second term. His domestic agenda was hindered by growing deficits and the fallout of the Iran–Contra affair. However, the administration did win a significant foreign policy success when Reagan and Soviet leader Mikhail Gorbachev reached the Intermediate-Range Nuclear Forces Treaty INF Treaty in 1987. Reagan also appointed numerous conservative judges, including Associate Justices Antonin Scalia and Sandra Day O'Connor and William Rehnquist, who Reagan elevated to the position of Chief Justice. The Rehnquist Court would hand down several conservative decisions in ensuing years. Vice President Bush defeated Senator Bob Dole and televangelist Pat Robertson to win the 1988 Republican primaries. Aided by Reagan's renewed popularity, Bush defeated Michael Dukakis in the 1988 presidential election.

== Popular culture ==
Tom Clancy wrote three best-selling novels that illuminate the Reagan era: The Hunt for Red October (1984), Red Storm Rising (1986), and The Cardinal of the Kremlin (1988), which reflect Reagan-era Cold War values. The Soviet Union as an evil empire and the superiority of American values and technology are all themes both of Clancy's thrillers and Reagan's rhetoric. Policy elites used these novels (and the filming of one of them) to promote their ideas of national security to the American public.

Kendrick Lamar has a song titled "Ronald Reagan Era" off of his 2011 album Section.80, and Killer Mike has a song titled "Reagan" off his 2012 album R.A.P. Music. Reagan appears as a character in the comic books The Dark Knight Returns (1986) and Legends (1986–87).

== International ==
Many scholars take an international perspective, linking the Reagan era with the Thatcher era in Britain. As one scholar explained:

Throughout many of the capitalist democracies in Western Europe and in North America, the recession that began with the sharp rise in petroleum prices in 1973–1974 signaled an epochal shift in the patchwork of growth- based economic and social policies....The demise of Keynesianism which followed meant far more than the obsolescence of an economic doctrine that had been used to justify a broad range of economic policies. It represented a significant retreat from a vision of society—the Keynesian welfare state—that had motivated state strategies to harmonise interests through social policy, to politically regulate the market economy and thereby reduce class and diverse social conflicts, and to promulgate for the state a tutelary role in securing business and trade union acquiescence (and less commonly approval) for a limited set of important economic policies.

== Historiography ==
Historian Doug Rossinow reported in 2007, "As of this writing, among academic historians, the Reagan revisionists—who view the 1980s as an era of mixed blessings at worst, and of great forward strides in some renditions—hold the field". Other scholars agree on the importance of the Reagan era.

According to John Kenneth White, the Reagan era ended in the early 21st century, as typified by the election and reelection of Barack Obama in 2008 and 2012. White argues that the Reagan coalition was shrinking in size and in self-confidence. The weak Republican response to the 2008 financial crisis was a major blow. White argues that major cultural and demographic changes helped end the Reagan era. Besides the rapid growth in college-educated voters, White emphasizes revolutions in terms of race, family, gay rights, and religion. The very rapid growth of immigration from Asia and Latin America changed the American population structure, and had a special impact on California. The once sacrosanct ideal of the nuclear family gave way to new tolerance regarding premarital sex, easy divorce, single parenting, and cohabitation. The religious conservatives tried to hold the line on abortion and gay rights. The conservative fundamentalist religious denominations had been rapidly expanding before and during the Reagan years, and were a key base of his support. Their growth suddenly stopped and decline began, producing a rapid growth of secularization. The combination of these factors, White argues, produced, "the death of the Reagan coalition."

== See also ==
- Conservatism in the United States
- Fusionism, of which Reagan was the first presidential proponent
- History of conservatism in the United States
- History of the United States (1980–1991)
- History of the United States (1991–2016)
- Neoliberalism
- Political positions of Ronald Reagan
- Sixth Party System

== Works cited ==
- Wilentz, Sean (2008). The Age of Reagan. HarperCollins. ISBN 978-0-06-074480-9.
