= Reagan tax cuts =

Tax cuts under President Reagan

The phrase Reagan tax cuts refers to changes to the United States federal tax code passed during the presidency of Ronald Reagan. There were two major tax cuts: the Economic Recovery Tax Act of 1981 and the Tax Reform Act of 1986.

- The first tax cut (Economic Recovery Tax Act of 1981) among other things, cut the highest personal income tax rate from 70% to 50% and the lowest from 14% to 11% and decreased the highest capital gains tax rate from 28% to 20%.
- The second tax cut (Tax Reform Act of 1986) among other things, cut the highest personal income tax rate from 50% to 38.5% but decreasing to 28% in the following years and increased the highest capital gains tax rate from 20% to 28%. It was designed as a revenue neutral bill, and reduced government tax revenues by less than $1 billion over four years.

At the time, people were not substantially informed about the tax cuts, as an ABC News Poll in September 1986 showed that 63% of Americans did not know enough about the Tax Reform Act of 1986 to say if it was good or bad.

== Historical tax rates ==
Top Marginal Tax Rates 1913-2010

The top marginal income tax rate, that is, the rate paid on the 'last dollar' of the highest earner's income, was increased to 77% on the 2 millionth dollar earned during and to help finance the cost of fighting World War I. This rate was cut over a period of 5 years following the war to a low of 25% in 1925, and tax collection as a share of output fell dramatically. In response to pressure from a now Democratic Party-controlled Congress, President Herbert Hoover reluctantly agreed to raise the top marginal rate to finance relief programs. In the resulting Revenue Act of 1932 the top marginal tax rate was raised from 25% to 63%. The top marginal rate was again raised in 1936 and 1940. In 1941, the Empire of Japan attacked the United States at Pearl Harbor. In response, the Congress declared war on Japan and Germany and enacted an additional tax increase to help finance new war spending - raising the top marginal rate to its all-time-high of 94% on the $200,000th earned ($3.2M in 2021 dollars). Following the War, Congress reduced the top marginal rate to a low of 82.13% on the 200,000th dollar in 1949. The top marginal rate fluctuated between 70% and 92% on the 200,000th to the 400,000th dollar (the bracket on which the rate was charged was changed as well) over the following 20 years. During this time the Social Security Act created a Social Security tax, though because the Social Security tax is capped at ~$130,000 per individual this did not add to the overall top marginal rate. Under President John F. Kennedy the top marginal rate was decreased in the Revenue Act of 1964 to 70%. In 1980 Ronald Reagan was elected and promised to cut the top marginal tax rate. This he did, and the top marginal tax rate was lowered over his 8 years in office from 73% to 28% on incomes over just $29,750 - the lowest this rate had been since 1925.

== After effects ==
The Economic Recovery Tax Act of 1981 reduced revenues by $200 billion (in 2012 dollars) over the next four years. However, Tax Equity and Fiscal Responsibility Act of 1982, and the following 1983, 1984, and 1987 tax increases signed by Reagan increased revenue by $137 billion (in 2012 dollars).

== See also ==
- Reaganomics
- Bush tax cuts
- Taxation history of the United States
