= Fiscal drag =

Macroeconomic condition

Fiscal drag happens when the government's net fiscal position (spending minus taxation) fails to cover the net savings desires of the private economy, also called the private economy's spending gap (earnings minus spending and private investment). The resulting lack of aggregate demand leads to deflationary pressure, or drag, on the economy, essentially due to lack of state spending or to excess taxation.

One cause of fiscal drag may be bracket creep, where progressive taxation increases automatically as taxpayers move into higher tax brackets due to inflation. This tends to moderate inflation, and can be characterized as an automatic stabilizer to the economy. Fiscal drag can also be a result of a hawkish stance towards government finances.

== Real fiscal drag ==
Real fiscal drag takes place when tax thresholds are increased in line with price rises to avoid nominal fiscal drag, but where a growing economy means that earnings rise faster still, so increasing taxes as a proportion of earnings.

== Political dimension ==
Ireland is an example of a country in which, in recent years, the progressive income tax system has allowed government revenues to swell due to both nominal and real fiscal drag without either increases in the tax rates or decreases in the thresholds. That is because the country has experienced considerable economic growth, which some attribute to the low-interest monetary regime of the European Central Bank, resulting in high wage inflation. Whereas others attribute to the economic and educational policies of the Irish government, in subsidizing education and eliminating taxation of the arts, two historically low-income demographics that would thus respond strongly to an increase in income, resulting in price inflation and thus wage inflation to retain purchasing power parity.

== See also ==
- Fiscal deficit
- Bracket creep
