= Tax Equity and Fiscal Responsibility Act of 1982 =

United States federal law

- Long title: An act to provide for tax equity and fiscal responsibility, and for other purposes.
- Acronyms (colloquial): TEFRA
- Enacted by: the 97th United States Congress

Citations
- Public law: 97-248
- Statutes at Large: 96 Stat. 324

Legislative history
- Introduced in the House as H.R. 4961 by Pete Stark (D–CA) on November 13, 1981; Committee consideration by House Ways and Means, Senate Finance; Passed the House on December 15, 1981 (voice vote); Passed the Senate on July 23, 1982 (50–47); Reported by the joint conference committee on August 15, 1982; agreed to by the House on August 19, 1982 (226–207) and by the Senate on August 19, 1982 (52–47); Signed into law by President Ronald Reagan on September 3, 1982

United States Supreme Court cases
- South Carolina v. Baker, 485 U.S. 505 (1988)

The Tax Equity and Fiscal Responsibility Act of 1982 (Pub. L. 97–248), also known as TEFRA, is a United States federal law that rescinded some of the effects of the Kemp-Roth Act passed the year before. Between summer 1981 and summer 1982, tax revenue fell by about 6% in real terms, caused by the dual effects of the economy dipping back into recession (the second dip of the "double dip recession") and Kemp-Roth's reduction in tax rates, and the deficit was likewise rising rapidly because of the fall in revenue and the rise in government expenditures. The rapid rise in the budget deficit created concern among many in Congress. TEFRA was created to reduce the budget gap by generating revenue through closure of tax loopholes; introduction of tougher enforcement of tax rules; rescinding some of Kemp-Roth's reductions in marginal personal income tax rates that had not yet gone into effect; and raising some rates, especially corporate rates. TEFRA was introduced November 13, 1981 and was sponsored by U.S. Representative Pete Stark of California. After much deliberation, the final version was signed by President Ronald Reagan on September 3, 1982.

== Summary of provisions ==
The Act included certain provisions related to the US health care system:

- Established the prospective payment system for inpatient hospital care using the diagnosis-related group (DRG) coding system
- Established authority for certain payments for hospice care
- Recognized Medicare as the "secondary payer" for health services to individuals covered by another private health insurance plan
- Established the provisions for utilization review as "reviews of the pattern of quality of care, in an area of medical practice where actual performance is measured against, objective criteria which define acceptable and adequate practice"
- Allowed for the contracting of health maintenance organizations to provide services to Medicare recipients (Part C of Medicare)
- Established the Katie Beckett waiver (also called the TEFRA waiver), a Medicaid waiver concerning the income eligibility for home-based Medicaid services for children under the age of nineteen.

The Office of Tax Analysis of the United States Department of the Treasury summarized the tax changes as follows:

- repealed scheduled increases in accelerated depreciation deductions
- tightened safe harbor leasing rules
- required taxpayers to reduce basis by 50% of investment tax credit
- instituted 10% withholding on dividends and interest paid to individuals
- tightened completed contract accounting rules
- increased FUTA wage base and tax rate

== Effects and controversies ==
The scheduled increases in accelerated depreciation deductions were repealed, a 10 percent withholding on dividends and interest paid to individuals was instituted, and the Federal Unemployment Tax Act wage base and tax rate were increased. Excise taxes on cigarettes were temporarily doubled, and excise taxes on telephone service temporarily tripled, in TEFRA.

President of the United States Ronald Reagan agreed to the tax hikes on the promise from Congress of a $3 reduction in spending for every $1 increase in taxes. Some conservatives, led by then-Congressman Jack Kemp, claim that the promised spending reductions never occurred. One week after TEFRA was signed, H.R. 6863 – the Supplemental Appropriations Act of 1982 which Ronald Reagan claimed would "bust the budget" was passed by both houses of Congress over his veto. Four years later, then-budget director David Stockman, however, stated that Congress substantially upheld its end of the bargain, and cites the Administration's failure to identify management savings and its resistance to defense spending cuts as the key impediments to greater outlay savings.

The original TEFRA bill as passed by the House would have lowered taxes. The Republican-controlled Senate replaced the text of the original House bill with a number of tax increases, and the bill became law after President Ronald Reagan signed it.

A lawsuit was filed by an individual named Garrison R. Armstrong, claiming that TEFRA violated the Origination Clause in Article One of the United States Constitution which requires all revenue bills to originate in the House. The United States Court of Appeals for the Ninth Circuit ruled against Armstrong, saying: "We therefore conclude that the Senate did not exceed its authority under the origination clause when it proposed the extensive amendments that ultimately became TEFRA."

In 1988, libertarian political writer Sheldon Richman described TEFRA as "the largest tax increase in American history." In 2003, former Reagan adviser Bruce Bartlett wrote in National Review that "TEFRA raised taxes by $37.5 billion per year", elaborating, "according to a recent Treasury Department study, TEFRA alone raised taxes by almost 1 percent of the gross domestic product, making it the largest peacetime tax increase in American history." However, this "increase" was achieved primarily through the cancellation of future tax cuts scheduled by ERTA the year before that had yet to take effect at the time of TEFRA's passage. Taxpayers still receive $375 billion in tax cuts in the 3 years following TEFRA.

A chart from the United States Department of the Treasury study showing the bill's effect on government revenues is reproduced below. As it shows, the TEFRA increased tax revenues by almost 1% (0.98%) of GDP, in marked contrast to the 1981 tax cuts and the milder effects of the other Reagan-era tax bills. The study makes note that these government revenue estimates do not take into account the effect of the bills on GDP, and therefore, are not inclusive of resulting increases in revenue that could occur from an increase in GDP:

The bill also created a hospice benefit to the Medicare program for the terminally ill with a 1986 sunset provision. It allowed States to add a hospice benefit to the Medicaid program.

Revenue effects of major tax bills enacted under Reagan (as percentage of GDP)
Tax bill	Number of years after enactment					
Tax bill	1	2	3	4	First 2-yr avg	4-yr avg
Economic Recovery Tax Act of 1981	−1.21	−2.60	−3.58	−4.15	−1.91	−2.89
Tax Equity and Fiscal Responsibility Act of 1982	0.53	1.07	1.08	1.23	0.80	0.98
Highway Revenue Act of 1982	0.05	0.11	0.10	0.09	0.08	0.09
Social Security Amendments of 1983	0.17	0.22	0.22	0.24	0.20	0.21
Interest and Dividend Tax Compliance Act of 1983	−0.07	−0.06	−0.05	−0.04	−0.07	−0.05
Deficit Reduction Act of 1984	0.24	0.37	0.47	0.49	0.30	0.39
Omnibus Budget Reconciliation Act of 1985	0.02	0.06	0.06	0.06	0.04	0.05
Tax Reform Act of 1986	0.41	0.02	−0.23	−0.16	0.22	0.01
Omnibus Budget Reconciliation Act of 1987	0.19	0.28	0.30	0.27	0.24	0.26
Total	0.33	−0.53	−1.63	−1.97	−0.10	−0.95
