= Bracket creep =

Increasing tax brackets pushed by inflation

Bracket creep is usually defined as the process by which inflation pushes wages and salaries into higher tax brackets, leading to fiscal drag. However, even if there is only one tax bracket, or one remains within the same tax bracket, there will still be bracket creep resulting in a higher proportion of income being paid in tax. That is, although the marginal tax rate remains unchanged with inflation, the average tax rate will increase.

Most progressive tax systems are not adjusted for inflation. As wages and salaries rise in nominal terms under the influence of inflation they become more highly taxed, even though in real terms the value of the wages and salaries has not increased at all. The net effect is that in real terms taxes rise unless the tax rates or brackets are adjusted to compensate.

== Examples ==
Suppose a person earns $20,000 per year and is liable to 20% tax on earnings above a threshold of $5,000 per year. Then they pay ($20,000–$5,000)*0.2 = $3,000 in taxes, or 15% of their income. Now suppose that due to inflation, their wage goes up by 5%, but the government does not increase the tax threshold. They must now pay ($21,000–$5,000)*0.2 = $3,200 or 15.2% of their income as tax. Thus the proportion of the person's income that is paid as tax has increased. The average tax rate went up even though the tax payer remained in the 20% tax bracket. That is, the marginal tax rate did not change. Since the wage increase was due to inflation, the person's net real income declined.

In the United States, the Alternative Minimum Tax originally (1971) targeted 155 high-income households; based on 2004 law, it would affect 20% of households by 2010.

== Developments ==
For 2022, the Tax Foundation estimates that "an average New Yorker making around $80,000 a year will be forced to shell out an extra $225 in taxes during this and next year's tax seasons".

== Political dimension ==
Nominal bracket creep can easily be countered by a system of index-linked tax brackets, but this may be politically undesirable. Many voters do not perceive the effects of bracket creep, and so the government may prefer to adjust tax brackets manually once every few years: in effect, restoring the real tax rates to their approximate pre-inflation levels but in a way that gives the government the appearance that they are cutting taxes.

== See also ==
- Inflation Reduction Act of 2022
- Money creation
- Fiscal drag
