= Tax Reform Act of 1986 =

US federal tax legislation

- Long title: An Act to reform the internal revenue laws of the United States.
- Acronyms (colloquial): TRA
- Nicknames: Tax Reform Act of 1985
- Enacted by: the 99th United States Congress

Citations
- Public law: 99-514
- Statutes at Large: 100 Stat. 2085

Codification
- Titles amended: 26 U.S.C.: Internal Revenue Code
- U.S.C. sections amended: 26 U.S.C. § 1 et seq.

Legislative history
- Introduced in the House as H.R. 3838 by Dan Rostenkowski (D–IL) on December 3, 1985; Committee consideration by House Ways and Means, Senate Finance; Passed the House on December 17, 1985 (passed voice vote); Passed the Senate on June 24, 1986 (97-3); Reported by the joint conference committee on September 18, 1986; agreed to by the House on September 25, 1986 (292-136) and by the Senate on September 27, 1986 (74-23); Signed into law by President Ronald Reagan on October 22, 1986

The Tax Reform Act of 1986 (TRA) was passed by the 99th United States Congress and signed into law by President Ronald Reagan on October 22, 1986.

The Tax Reform Act of 1986 was the top domestic priority of President Reagan's second term. The act lowered federal income tax rates, decreasing the number of tax brackets and reducing the top tax rate from 50 percent to 28 percent. The act also expanded the earned income tax credit, the standard deduction, and the personal exemption, removing approximately six million lower-income Americans from the tax base. Offsetting these cuts, the act increased the alternative minimum tax and eliminated many tax deductions, including deductions for rental housing, individual retirement accounts, and depreciation.

Although the tax reform was projected to be revenue-neutral, it was popularly referred to as the second round of Reagan tax cuts (following the Economic Recovery Tax Act of 1981). The bill passed with majority support in both the House and the Senate, receiving the votes of majorities among both congressional Republicans and Democrats, including Democratic Speaker of the House Tip O'Neill.

== Passage ==
After his victory in the 1984 presidential election, President Ronald Reagan made simplification of the tax code the central focus of his second term domestic agenda. Working with Speaker of the House Tip O'Neill, a Democrat who also favored tax reform, Reagan overcame significant opposition from members of Congress in both parties to pass the Tax Reform Act of 1986. The bill was signed by Reagan on October 22.

== Income tax rates ==
The top tax rate for individuals for tax year 1987 was lowered from 50% to 33%. Many lower-level tax brackets were consolidated, and the upper income level of the bottom rate (married filing jointly) was increased from $5,720/year to $29,750/year. This package ultimately consolidated tax brackets from fifteen levels of income to four levels of income. The standard deduction, personal exemption, and earned income credit were also expanded, resulting in the removal of six million poor Americans from the income tax roll and a reduction of income tax liability across all income levels. The higher standard deduction substantially simplified the preparation of tax returns for many individuals.

For tax year 1987, the act provided a graduated rate structure of 15%/28%/33%. Beginning with tax year 1988, the act provided a nominal rate structure of 15%/28%/33%, but taxpayers having taxable income higher than a certain level were taxed at an effective rate of about 28%. This was jettisoned in the Omnibus Budget Reconciliation Act of 1990, otherwise known as the "Bush tax increase", which violated his taxpayer protection pledge.

== Tax incentives ==
The act also increased incentives favoring investment in owner-occupied housing relative to rental housing. Prior to the act, all personal interest was deductible. Subsequently, only home mortgage interest was deductible, including interest on home equity loans. The act phased out many investment incentives for rental housing, through extending the depreciation period of rental property from 15–19 years to 27.5 years. It also discouraged real estate investing by eliminating the deduction for passive losses. To the extent that low-income people may be more likely to live in rental housing than in owner-occupied housing, this provision of the act could have had the tendency to decrease the new supply of housing accessible to low-income people. The Low-Income Housing Tax Credit was added to the act to provide some balance and encourage investment in multifamily housing for the poor.

Moreover, interest on consumer loans such as credit card debt was no longer deductible. An existing provision in the tax code, called Income Averaging, which reduced taxes for those only recently making a much higher salary than before, was eliminated (although later partially reinstated, for farmers in 1997 and for fishermen in 2004). The act, however, increased the personal exemption and standard deduction.

The individual retirement account (IRA) deduction was severely restricted. The IRA had been created as part of the Employee Retirement Income Security Act of 1974, where employees not covered by a pension plan could contribute the lesser of $1500 or 15% of earned income. The Economic Recovery Tax Act of 1981 (ERTA) removed the pension plan clause and raised the contribution limit to the lesser of $2000 or 100% of earned income. The 1986 Tax Reform Act retained the $2000 contribution limit, but restricted the deductibility for households that have pension plan coverage and have moderate to high incomes. Non-deductible contributions were allowed.

Depreciation deductions were also curtailed. Prior to ERTA, depreciation was based on "useful life" calculations provided by the Treasury Department. ERTA set up the "accelerated cost recovery system" (ACRS). This set up a series of useful lives based on three years for technical equipment, five years for non-technical office equipment, ten years for industrial equipment, and fifteen years for real property. TRA86 lengthened these lives, and lengthened them further for taxpayers covered by the alternative minimum tax (AMT). These latter, longer lives approximate "economic depreciation", a concept economists have used to determine the actual life of an asset relative to its economic value.

Defined contribution (DC) pension contributions were curtailed. The law prior to TRA86 was that DC pension limits were the lesser of 25% of compensation or $30,000. This could be accomplished by any combination of elective deferrals and profit sharing contributions. TRA86 introduced an elective deferral limit of $7000, indexed to inflation. Since the profit sharing percentage must be uniform for all employees, this had the intended result of making more equitable contributions to 401(k)'s and other types of DC pension plans.

The 1986 Tax Reform Act introduced the General Nondiscrimination rules which applied to qualified pension plans and 403(b) plans that for private sector employers. It did not allow such pension plans to discriminate in favor of highly compensated employees. A highly compensated employee for the purposes of testing a plan's compliance for the 2006 plan year is any employee whose compensation exceeded $95,000 in the 2005 plan year. Therefore, all new hires are by definition nonhighly compensated employees. A plan could not give benefits or contributions on a more favorable basis for the highly compensated employees if it cannot pass the minimum coverage test and the minimum participation test.

== Fraudulent dependents ==
The act required people claiming children as dependents on their tax returns to obtain and list a Social Security number for every claimed child, to verify the child's existence. Before this act, parents claiming tax deductions were on the honor system not to lie about the number of children they supported. The requirement was phased in, and initially Social Security numbers were required only for children over the age of 5. During the first year, this anti-fraud change resulted in seven million fewer dependents being claimed, nearly all of which are believed to have involved either children that never existed, or tax deductions improperly claimed by non-custodial parents.

== Changes to the AMT ==
The original alternative minimum tax targeted tax shelters used by a few wealthy households. However, the Tax Reform Act of 1986 greatly expanded the AMT to aim at a different set of deductions that most Americans receive. Things like the personal exemption, state and local taxes, the standard deduction, private activity bond interest, certain expenses like union dues and even some medical costs for the seriously ill could now trigger the AMT. In 2007, the New York Times reported: "A law for untaxed rich investors was refocused on families who own their homes in high tax states."

== Passive losses and tax shelters ==
26 U.S.C. § 469 (relating to limitations on deductions for passive activity losses and limitations on passive activity credits) removed many tax shelters, especially for real estate investments. This contributed to the end of the real estate boom of the early-to-mid 1980s, which in turn was the primary cause of the U.S. savings and loan crisis.

Prior to 1986, passive investors were able to use real estate losses to offset taxable income. When losses from these deals were no longer able to be deducted, many investors sold their assets, which contributed to sinking real estate prices.

To help small landlords, The Tax Reform Act of 1986 included a temporary $25,000 net rental loss deduction, provided that the property was not personally used for the greater of 14 days or 10% of rental days, and adjusted gross income was less than $100,000.

== Tax treatment of technical service firms employing certain professionals ==
The Internal Revenue Code does not contain any definition or rules dealing with the issue of when a worker should be characterized for tax purposes as an employee, rather than as an independent contractor. The tax treatment depends on the application of (20) factors provided by common law, which varies by state.

Introduced by Senator Daniel Patrick Moynihan, Section 1706 added a subsection (d) to Section 530 of the Revenue Act of 1978, which removed "safe harbor" exception for independent contractor classification (which at the time avoided payroll taxes) for workers such as engineers, designers, drafters, computer professionals, and "similarly skilled" workers.

If the IRS determines that a third-party intermediary firm's worker previously treated as self-employed should have been classified as an employee, the IRS assesses substantial back taxes, penalties and interest on that third-party intermediary company, though not directly against the worker or the end client. It does not apply to individuals directly contracted to clients.

The change in the tax code was expected to offset tax revenue losses of other legislation Moynihan proposed that changed the law on foreign taxes of Americans working abroad. At least one firm simply adapted its business model to the new regulations. A 1991 Treasury Department study found that tax compliance for technology professionals was among the highest of all self-employed workers and that Section 1706 would raise no additional tax revenue and could possibly result in losses as self-employed workers did not receive as many tax-free benefits as employees.

In one report in 2010, Moynihan's initiative was labeled "a favor to IBM". A suicide note by software professional Joseph Stack, who flew his airplane into a building housing IRS offices in February 2010, blamed his problems on many factors, including the Section 1706 change in the tax law while even mentioning Senator Moynihan by name, though no intermediary firm is mentioned, and failure to file a return was admitted.

== Name of the Internal Revenue Code ==
Section 2(a) of the act also officially changed the name of the Internal Revenue Code from the Internal Revenue Code of 1954 to the Internal Revenue Code of 1986. Although the act made numerous amendments to the 1954 Code, it was not a re-enactment or a substantial re-codification or reorganization of the overall structure of the 1954 Code. Thus, the tax laws since 1954 (including those after 1986) have taken the form of amendments to the 1954 Code, although it is now called the 1986 Code.
