= List of banks in Belarus =

This is a list of banks in Belarus. The National Bank of the Republic of Belarus is the central bank of Belarus.

== List ==
List as of 28 July 2022:

- (Russia) Alfa-Bank Belarus, fully owned by Alfa-Bank
- (Belarus) Belagroprombank, state-owned
- (Belarus) Belarusbank, state-owned
- (Russia) Belgazprombank, jointly owned by Gazprom (49.82 percent) and Gazprombank (49.82 percent)
- (Belarus) Belinvestbank, state-owned
- (Georgia (country)) BNB-Bank, fully-owned by Bank of Georgia
- (Russia) Bank BelVEB, 97.52 percent-owned by Vnesheconombank
- (Belarus) BSB Bank, owned by several Swiss-based entities
- Dabrabyt Bank, fully-owned by the National Bank of the Republic of Belarus
- (Belarus) MTBank, owned by Alexey Oleksin and Inna Oleksina
- (Kazakhstan) Neo Bank Asia (formerly BTA Bank), owned by SNRG Capital Eurasia Limited Liability Company
- (Belarus) Paritetbank, owned by Rasim Ismailov
- (United Arab Emirates) Priorbank, formerly owned by Raiffeisen Bank International
- (United Arab Emirates) Reshenie Bank, jointly owned by Saturn-Info (66,97 percent) and Intersportproject (33,03 percent)
- (Belarus) RRB-Bank, majority-owned by Dikris (79.95 percent) with minority stakes of Speedster-М (6.86 percent) and Valentin Tsybulin (10.06 percent)
- (Russia) Sber Bank Belarus, 93.3-percent owned by Sberbank
- (Belarus) Status Bank, owned by Vladimir Vasilko (Uladzimir Vasilka, 49.75 percent) and Sergey Litvin (48.75 percent)
- Technobank, owned by Kozarenko V.A; Kozarenko E.M.; Kurach I.A (Belarus); and Irish-based Fleetwood Finance
- (Iran) Trade Capital Bank, fully-owned by Tejarat Bank
- (Russia) VTB Bank Belarus, fully-owned by VTB Bank
- (Belarus) Zepter Bank, fully-owned by Swiss-based Home Art and Sales Services AG

== See also ==
- List of banks in Europe
