= Development Bank of the Republic of Belarus =

Belarusian state bank

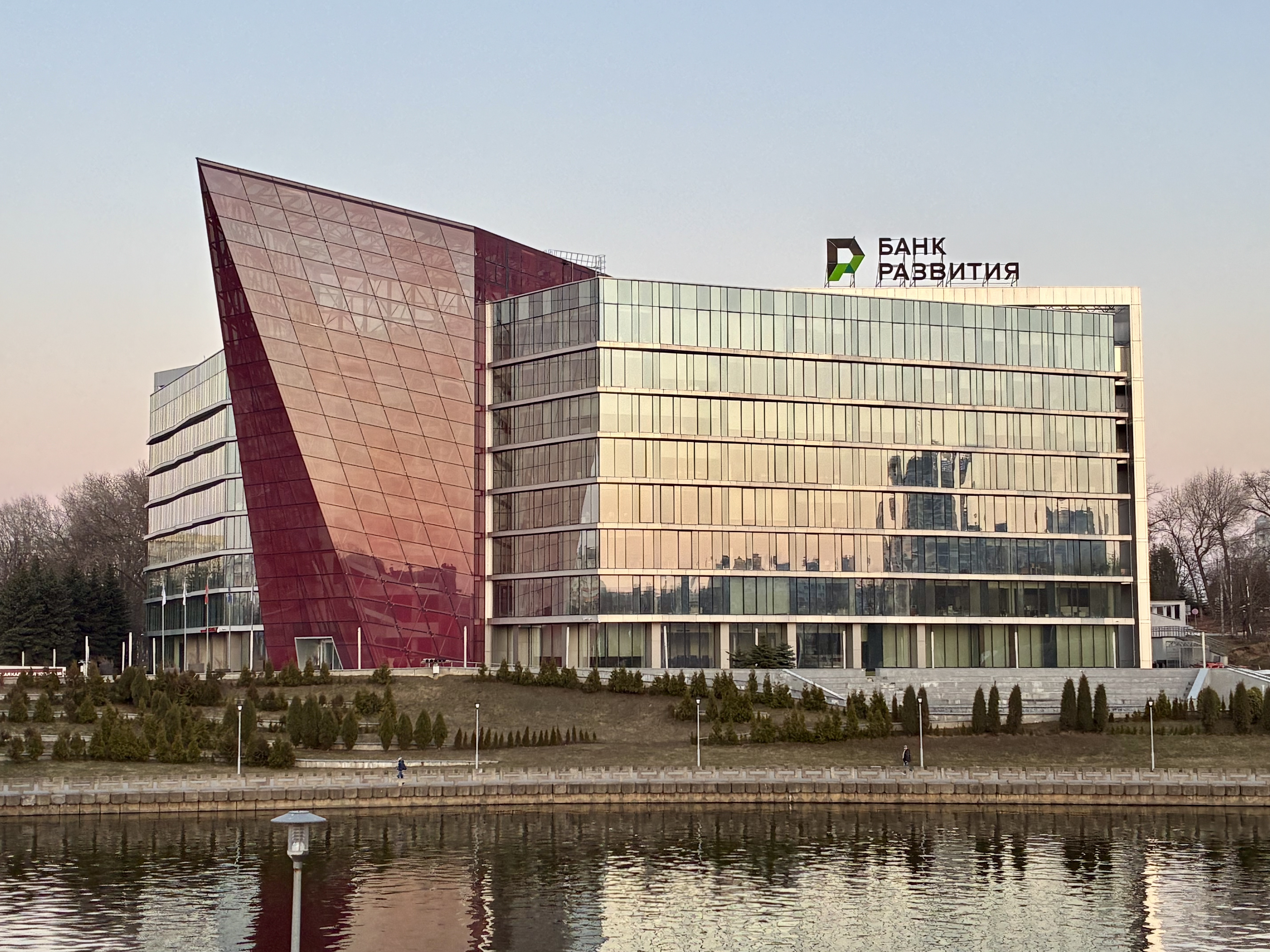
- Type: OJSC
- Industry: Financial services
- Founded: June 21, 2011; 15 years ago
- Founders: Government of Belarus; National Bank of the Republic of Belarus
- Headquarters: 35 Masherov Avenue, Minsk, Belarus
- Area served: Belarus
- Key people: Sergey Stolyarchuk (Chairman of the Management Board)
- Services: Asset management; Banking; Investment management
- Revenue: US$135.5 million (2021)
- Net income: US$121.0 million (2021)
- Total assets: US$5.3 billion (2021)
- Total equity: US$792.7 million (2021)
- Number of employees: 487 (2024)
- Subsidiaries: OJSC «Promagroleasing»; LLC «Business Consult BR»
- Website: brrb.by

Development Bank of the Republic of Belarus (Belarusian: Банк развіцця Рэспублікі Беларусь, Russian: Банк развития Республики Беларусь) is Belarusian development bank that operates as a specialized financial institution. It was established on June 21, 2011 by the Government of Belarus and the National Bank of the Republic of Belarus. The creation of the Development Bank was carried out in cooperation with international financial organizations, in particular, the International Monetary Fund and the World Bank.

Due to Russia's invasion of Ukraine in 2022, the Development Bank is under sanctions from all EU countries and some other countries.

== History ==
On June 21, 2011, the Decree of the President of the Republic of Belarus dated June 21, 2011 No. 261 «On the establishment of the Open Joint Stock Company Development Bank of the Republic of Belarus» was signed. One of the main tasks of the bank is to provide loans for the implementation of projects included in government programs. On August 16, 2011, the first meeting of the bank's supervisory board was held, chaired by Prime Minister Mikhail Myasnikovich. In December 2012, the bank's management board decided to establish branches in five regional centers of Belarus. Branches were opened in Grodno and Mogilev in May 2013, Vitebsk in November, Brest and Gomel in December, and Minsk in 2015.

In January 2013, the Development Bank received the right to provide export loans in excess of one million US dollars with government support, finance activities involving the purchase of goods for leasing, and also became the main shareholder of the national leasing operator, OJSC «Promagroleasing». On April 29, the bank signed a basic agreement with «AKA Ausfuhrkredit», which provides for the basic conditions for the financial supply of European goods to Belarus. On August 23, the Development Bank signed the first export credit agreement with «Mongolian-Belarusian Joint Venture Company Limited United Belaz Machinery», which is the official representative of OJSC «BELAZ Holding» in Mongolia. In September of the same year, «Standard & Poor's» awarded the bank its first international rating.

On August 21, 2014, the bank's board approved the rules for financing small and medium-sized businesses. The Bank has signed bilateral agreements with OJSC «Bank BelVEB», OJSC «Belgazprombank» and OJSC «BNB-Bank» on the procedure for cooperation in the framework of financing small and medium-sized businesses, providing for the provision of financial resources to these banks for lending to small and medium-sized businesses.

In the period 2014-2015, family capital funds began to flow into the management of the Development Bank. In addition, the Development Bank was able to finance OJSC «Promagroleasing» for the purchase and leasing of machinery and equipment with state support. On October 22, 2015, the bank was entrusted with asset management functions for nine basic enterprises of the woodworking industry. On August 27, the bank concluded the first deal with OJSC «Belgazprombank» to provide targeted credit resources.

On December 19, 2019, the bank's tasks included financing independently selected investment projects, providing loans to finance public-private partnership activities, and securing the right to issue bank guarantees.

On April 4, 2024, Sergey Stolyarchuk was appointed chairman of the management board, replacing Alexander Egorov, who held this position in 2021—2024.

== Investment projects ==
- construction of a second runway at Minsk National Airport with auxiliary facilities for the design type of A380 aircraft equipped with a precision landing system of the third category (the amount of loan investments is $178.9 million);
- expansion of the aircraft fleet of Belavia Airlines: three Boeing 737-800 aircraft were acquired, five are Embraer—195 and one Embraer—175 (the amount of loan investments is $223.3 million);
- construction of the first section of the third line of the Minsk Metro from Kovalskaya Sloboda station to Yubileynaya Ploshchad station (loan amount — $200 million);
- construction of the second Minsk automobile ring road (loan amount — $397.5 million);
- reconstruction of the R-23 Minsk—Mikashevichy highway (loan amount — $91.9 million);
- reconstruction of the railway bridge under the automobile bridge over the Neman River with transport approaches in Grodno (the amount of loan investments is $61 million);
- reconstruction of the 750 kV Belorusskaya substation (the amount of loan investments is €30.9 million);
- creation of the agricultural enterprise Danprod for the production of bacon pork (the amount of loan investments is about €25 million);
- construction of the western bypass of Brest (loan amount — $13 million);
- construction of the Borisov Arena football stadium (loan amount — $8.7 million).

== Sanctions ==
In 2022, «in response to the fact that Belarus significantly facilitated and supported Russia's invasion of Ukraine, as well as supported the Russian armed forces», the Development Bank came under sanctions from all EU countries and was disconnected from SWIFT.

On November 22, 2022, the Development Bank was sanctioned by Canada, as the bank is a representative of the economic sector, «critically important for the Lukashenko regime and its current policies that threaten the security of Ukraine and Ukrainians». For similar reasons, the Development Bank is on the sanctions lists of Japan, New Zealand, Ukraine and Switzerland. In January 2023, Ukraine added a subsidiary, OJSC «Promagroleasing», to its sanctions list
