= Nadezhda Yermakova =

Belarusian economist (born 1956)

- Надзея Ермакова

Chairwoman of the National Bank of the Republic of Belarus
- In office 2011–2014
- Preceded by: Pyotr Prakapovich
- Succeeded by: Pavel Kallaur

Personal details
- Born: Nadzieja Andreyevna Jermakova; 1953 (age 72–73) Razalmova, Khotsimsk district, Soviet Union
- Education: Belarus State Economic University

Nadezhda Andreyevna Yermakova (Belarusian: Надзея Андрэеўна Ермакова; born 1953) is a Belarusian economist, member of the Presidium of the All-Belarusian People's Assembly since 2024 representing the civil society through the Women's Union of Belarus. She was the chairwoman of the National Bank of the Republic of Belarus between 2011 and 2014 and of the Belarusbank between 1996 and 2011.

== Early life ==
Yermakova was born in 1953 in the village of Razalmova, Khotsimsk district, Soviet Union. At the age of 15, Jermakova began her studies at the School of Accounting and Credit in Pinsk and in 1971 returned to her hometown where she began working at the local office of the Belarus' office of the State Bank of the USSR, where Jermakova rose to become director and earned a degree at the Belarus State Economic University.

== Career ==
In 1979, she moved to Kirovsk to become deputy manager of another branch of the same bank, where she lived for four years and became manager of the branch in Shklov, where she lived for twelve years, working most of the time as a civil servant and where she met Alexander Lukashenko.

When Lukashenko became president of Belarus, he named chairwoman of Belarusbank in 1996, to succeed Tamara Vinnikova. In 1999, she was elected president of the Women's Union of Belarus, an office she held until 2015 when Mariana Shchetkina succeeded her.

On 27 July 2011, Yermakova was appointed director of the National Bank of the Republic of Belarus, succeeding Pyotr Prakapovich Her first years in office were marked by the devaluation of the Belarusian ruble. She resigned in 2014. She is heading Belgazprombank since 2021.

On 24 April 2024, Yermakova was appointed to the Presidium of the All-Belarusian People's Assembly, the leadership of Belarus' highest organ of state power, representing the civil society through the Women's Union of Belarus.

== Personal life ==
She divorced twice and had two daughters.
