= Tamashowka =

Agrotown in Brest Region, Belarus

Tamashowka Тамашоўка (Belarusian)
- Agrotown
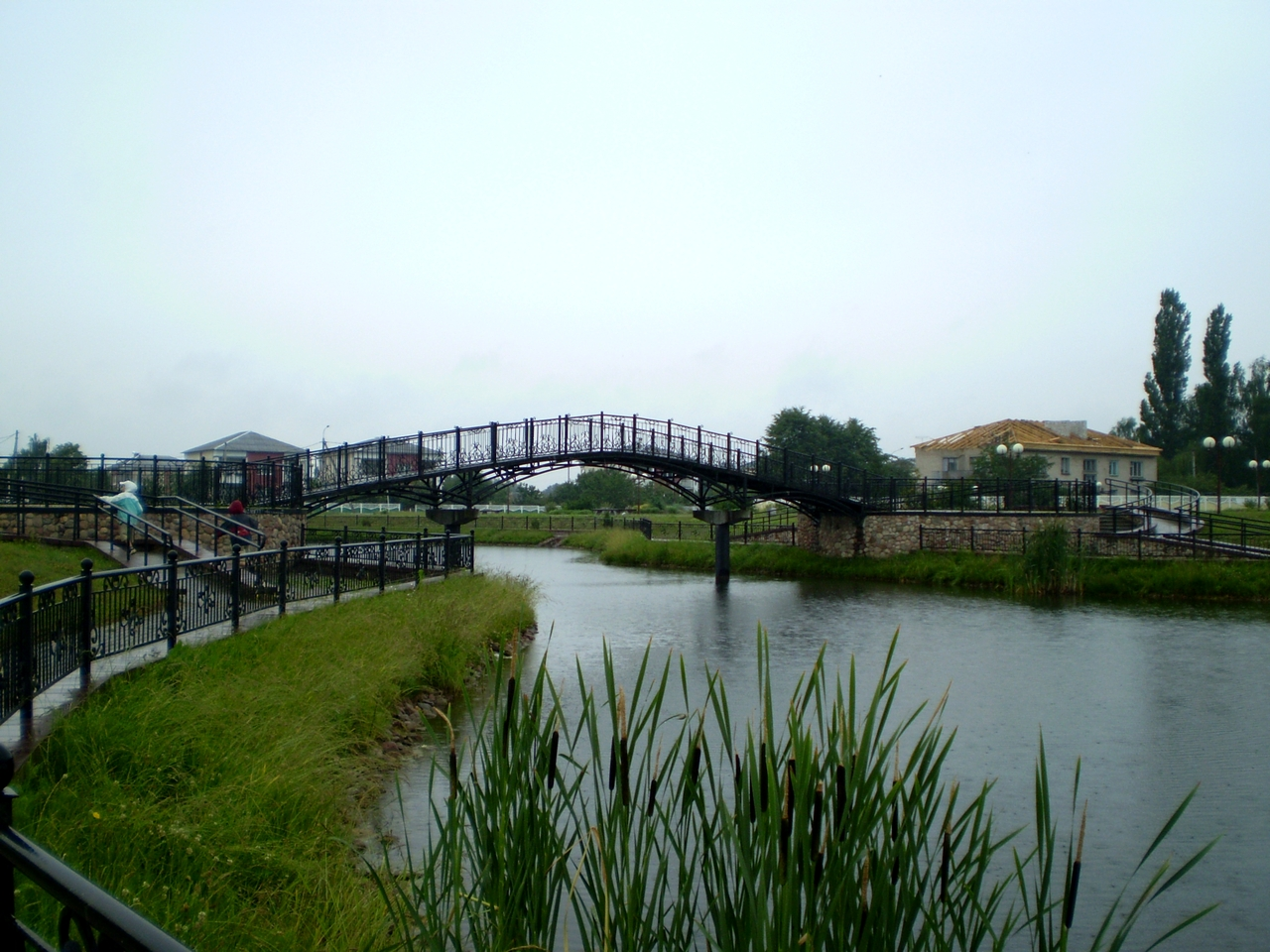
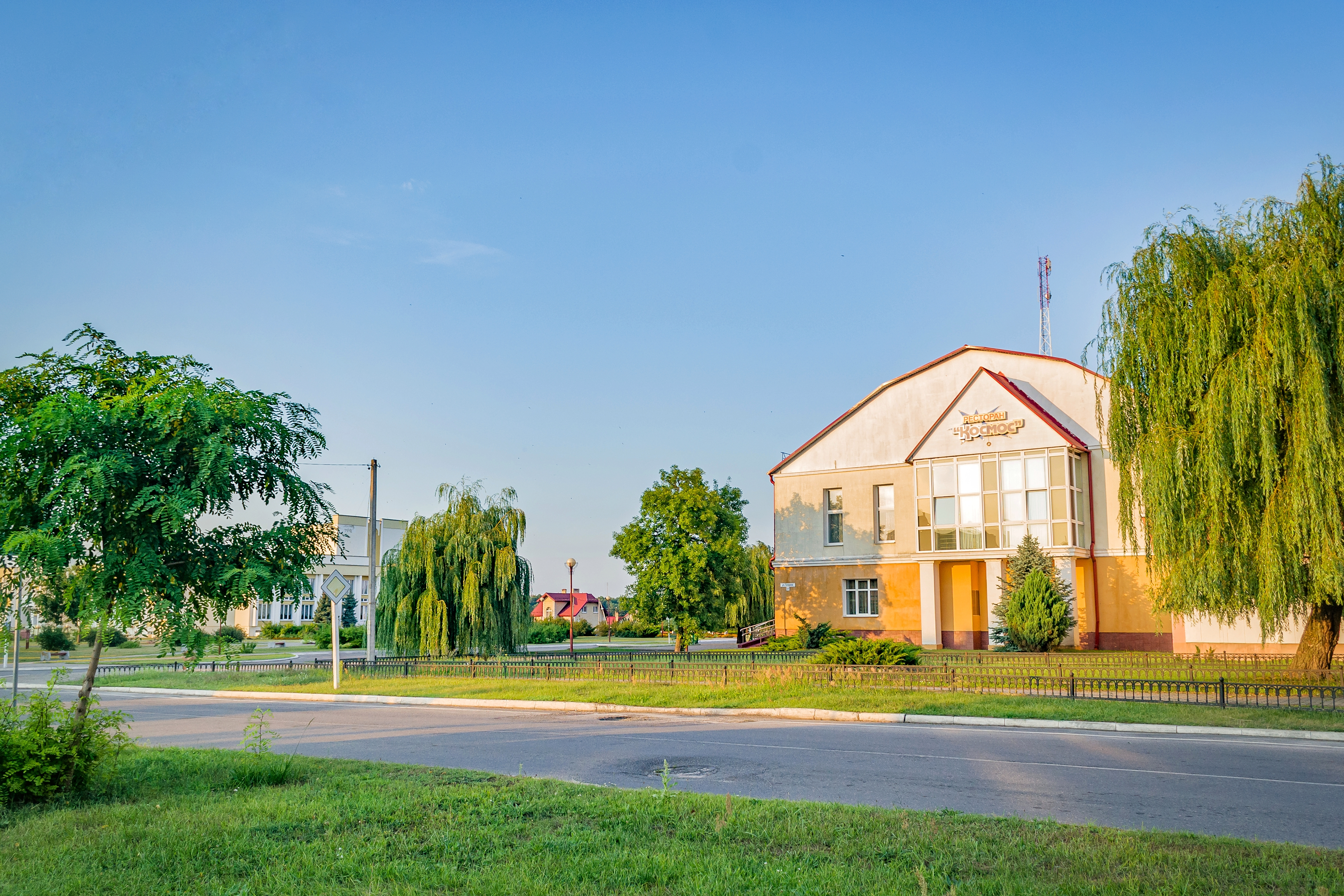
- Town centre
- Interactive map of Tamashowka
- Location within Belarus
- Coordinates: 51°33′20″N 23°36′11″E
- Country: Belarus
- Region: Brest Region
- District: Brest District
- Founded: 1900
- Elevation: 170 m (560 ft)

Population (2023)
  - Total: 1,161
- Time zone: UTC+3 (MSK)
- Postal Code: 225025
- Area code: +375 162
- ISO 3166 code: BY-HM
- License plate: 1

Tamashowka (Belarusian: Тамашоўка, romanized: Tamašoŭka; Russian: Томашовка, romanized: Tomashovka; Polish: Tomaszówka; Ukrainian: Томашівка, romanized: Tomashivka) is an agrotown in Brest District, Brest Region, Belarus. It serves as the administrative center of the Tamashowka rural council (selsoviet). It is situated near the tripoint joining Poland, Ukraine, and Belarus, in the attractive touristic region of Polesia. The town is located near the Bug River, 170 meters above sea level.

In 2009, the settlement had 1,131 inhabitants, and 1,235 in 2019. As of 2023, it has a population of 1,161.

Tamashowka has a high school, library, and culture house. The built-up areas end at Brest inbound rail, there is a railway station connected to Wlodawa. There is also a sanatorium in the settlement. Attractions include the Orthodox Church and the museum of astronautics, located on the premises of the high school.

== History ==
=== Russia and World War I ===
The settlement of Tamashowka was founded by Tomasz Zamoyski (1861–1935) of the Zamoyski family of Włodawa in the territory of the Przyborowo estate in the Grodno governorate in the late 19th century. This was most likely after the construction of the Chełm-Brest railway in 1887, when the Włodawa railway station was built in the village. In 1900, a factory of wooden materials for the District Railway Directorate in Vilnius was established in Tamashowka.

During the First World War, battles were fought near the town in 1915. 1,346 German, Austro-Hungarian, Russian and Polish soldiers are buried there.

Historic photographs of Tamashowka
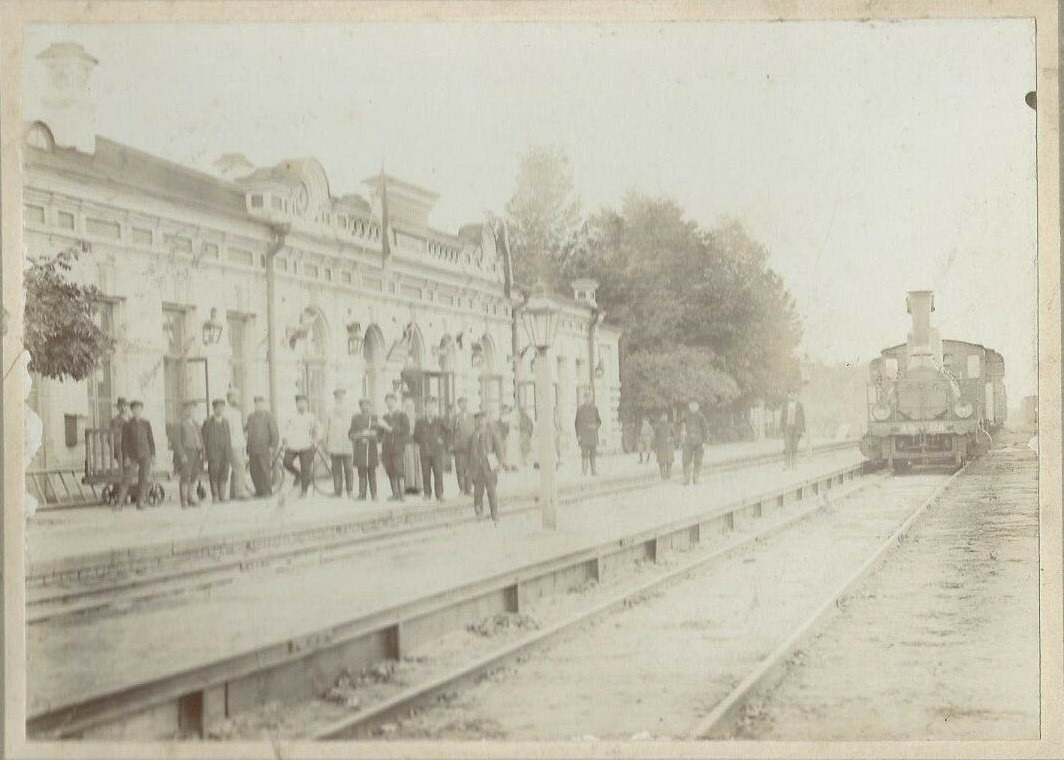
Uładava Railway Station (1903)

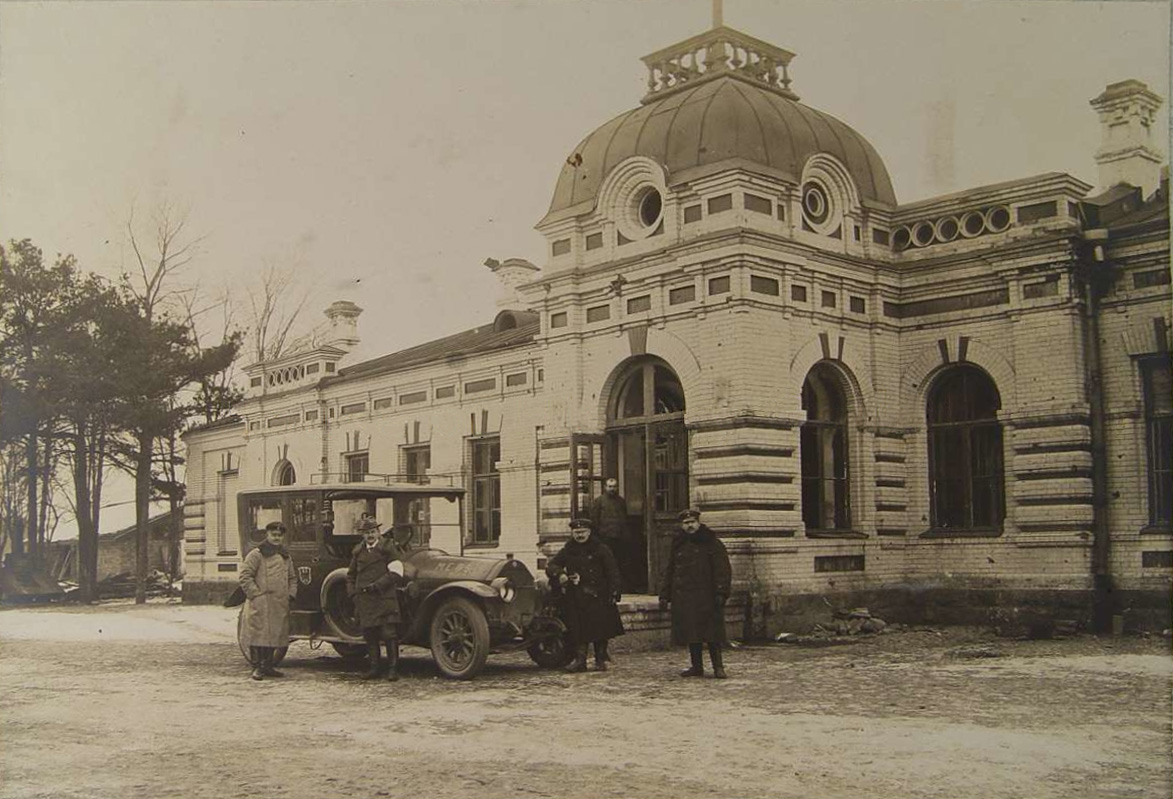
Uładava Railway Station (1915–18)

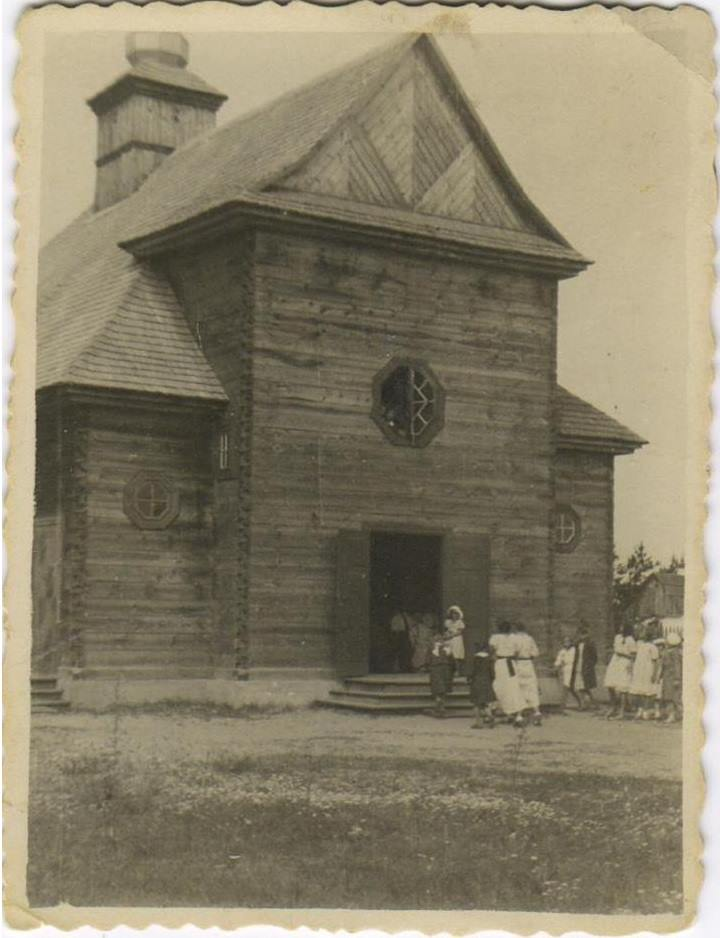
Catholic church (1921–39)

=== Second Republic ===
During the interwar period Tamashowka belonged to the commune of Przyborowo in the province of Brest. According to the census of 1921, Tamashowka consisted of a forester's lodge with three houses and a total of 18 inhabitants, eight men and ten women. Most of the inhabitants were Roman Catholic (17) and one was Orthodox. All but one claimed Polish ethnicity, with only one identifying as Belarusian. Separately, the Włodawka station (now in Tamashowka) contained 24 houses. A total of 185 people lived there: 98 men and 87 women. There were 128 Roman Catholics, 46 Orthodox and 11 Jews. Among the inhabitants there were 129 Poles, 36 Belarusians, 11 Jews and 9 Russians. In 1928, the station, including the whole commune of Przyborowo, was united with the commune of Damachava.

Tamashowka was connected with the western bank of the Bug River by a railway bridge near Orchówek and a road bridge in Włodawka. Immediately after the war, Count Tomasz Zamoyski divided his property in Tamashowka and the land was bought by Jews from Włodawka. Tamashowka established a number of social and economic connections with Włodawa and the regions on the left bank of the Bug River. In particular, the post office in Włodawa covered the settlement. A considerable part of the students of the gymnasium in Włodawa were young people from Tamashowka. In 1930, the Municipal Council of Włodawa tried to extend the town limits by connecting Tamashowka with the railway station in Włodawa. The project faced legal discrepancies between the former Congress Kingdom and the previously acquired lands.

During the interwar period Tamashowka became a center of trade for timber, fish, cattle, and flour. Local sawmills produced wood from the state forests or the Zamoyski estates. Fish came from nearby lakes and fish farms in the Polesie and Wołyński provinces. In addition, flour was produced in a mill in Tamashowka, which was partly supplied with wheat received at the Włodawa railway station.

Strong communications, proximity to the administrative and economic center of Włodawa (5 km away) and tourist conditions that attracted summer visitors resulted in the rapid development of Tamashowka. The population of Tamashowka doubled between 1930 and 1937 and reached 3,000 inhabitants.

=== World War II ===
In early September 1939, the bridges in Włodawa were bombed, causing many Poles and Jews to flee from the German army in the village. Militants under the influence of the NKVD began to operate in the Tamashowka area, killing Polish officers and intellectuals. As a result, on September 17, German troops entered the village and later withdrew, leaving the Red Army in control. Tamashowka then became part of the BSSR with the establishment of Soviet power.

In 1940, German soldiers who died at the hands of the Poles during the September Campaign and were buried in a local cemetery were exhumed by the Germans with the consent of the Soviet authorities and the participation of representatives of the Red Army, the NKVD, and local officials. The exhumed bodies were then transported to the Reich.

After the Nazi invasion of the USSR on June 22, 1941, the village came under German occupation. The local Jews were shot after the liquidation of the ghetto. The bodies of 2,200 murdered Jews were buried in a mass grave.

On July 22, 1944, the troops of the 1st Belorussian Front captured Tamashowka. After the war it was located on the border of Belarus.

=== After World War II ===
In June 1949, the village council of Tamashowka established a collective farm named after Dzerzhinsky in the village of Prybarava.

On December 31, 2011, the first sighting of jackals in Belarus occurred near the villages of Tamashowka and Selyakhi in the Brest district.

=== Present day ===
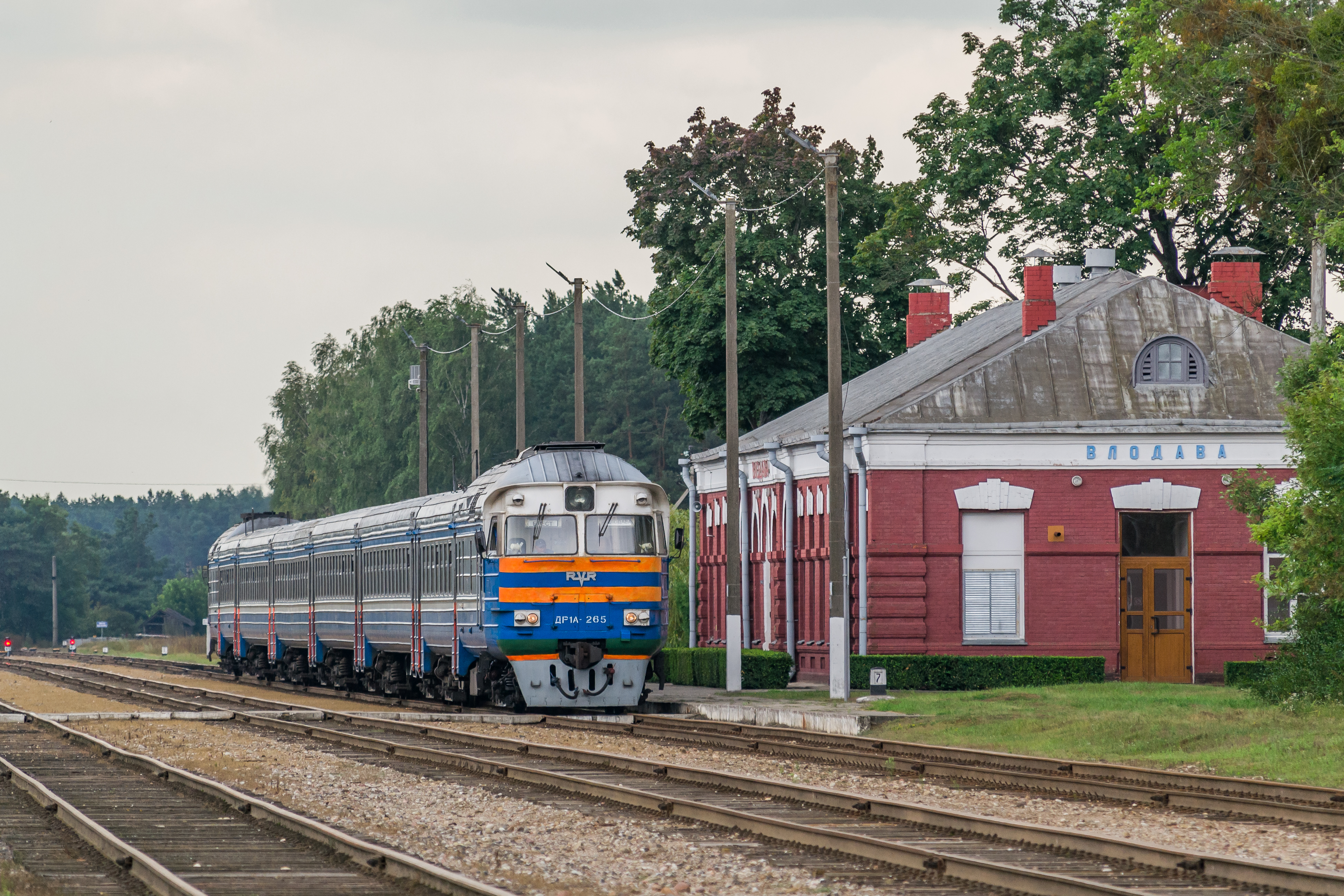
Tamashowka railway station with diesel train of regional economy class lines connecting Wlodawa to Brest-Central.

The town has a museum of cosmonautics, which has been located in the local secondary school since 1978. Next to the museum there is a bench where Pyotr Klimuk (a Soviet and Belarusian cosmonaut, born in nearby Komarówka) and Pyotr Prakapowich (President of the National Bank of the Republic of Belarus from 1998 to 2011) are said to have sat. The latter's brother, Wasilij, is the director of an agricultural enterprise in Tamashowka (OAO Komarowka).

The village also has a hotel, a restaurant, and a border crossing between Belarus and Ukraine: Tamashowka-Pulemets. There is also a railway station in Tamashowka, as well as an Orthodox parish deanery (благочиние) known as Brest-Region, Brest eparchy, and the Kobrin Exarchate Belarusian Moscow Patriarchate at the Church of the Protection of the Mother of God (Pokrovska, Свято-Покровская церковь).

For several years there have been discussions at various levels about the construction of a bridge over the Bug River and the opening of a Polish-Belarusian border crossing at Włodawa-Tamashowka.

== Historical monuments ==
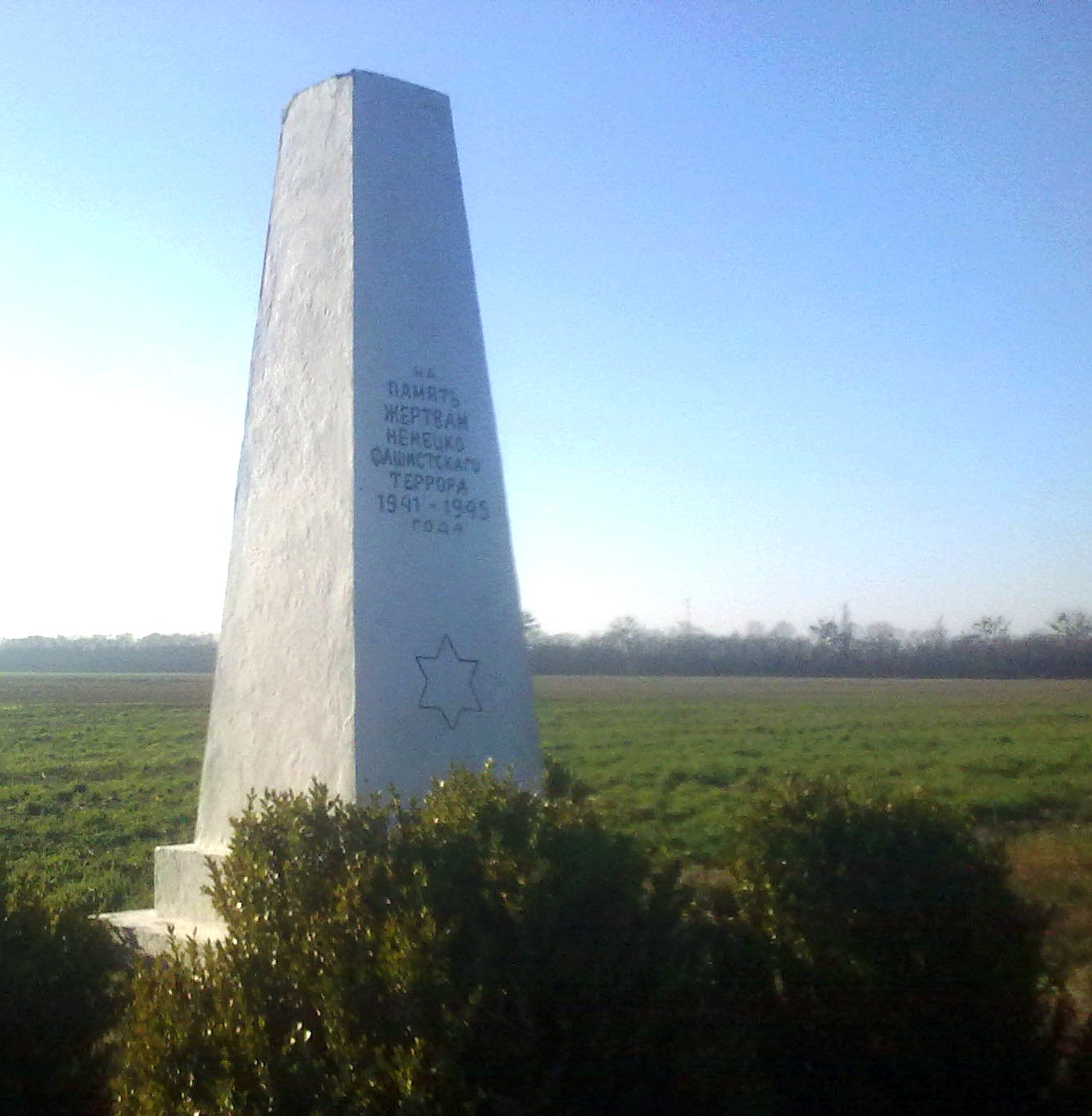
Monument to the murdered Jews – prisoners of the ghetto in the village of Tamashowka, Brest region. The monument was erected in 1954.

- Cemetery of World War I soldiers.
- Fraternal grave of border guards from 1941.
- Grave of victims of fascism from 1941 onwards.
- The building of the Włodawa railway station from the beginning of the 20th century

== Notable people ==
- Pyotr Prakapovich – Belarusian statesman, Hero of Belarus, chairman of the Board of the National Bank of the Republic of Belarus (1998–2011). He studied at Tamashowka High School.
- Pyotr Klimuk – Soviet cosmonaut – Belarusian, twice Hero of the Soviet Union, Colonel-General of Aviation

== Bibliography ==
- Michalski, Stanisław Edmund (1939). Włodawa: monografia statystyczno-gospodarcza [Włodawa: statistical and economic monograph] (in Polish). Lublin: Towarzystwo Naukowe Katolickiego Uniwersytetu Lubelskiego [The Learned Society of the John Paul II Catholic University of Lublin]. OCLC 37011828.
