= Alexander Yegorov (banker) =

Belarusian banker and politician (born 1986)

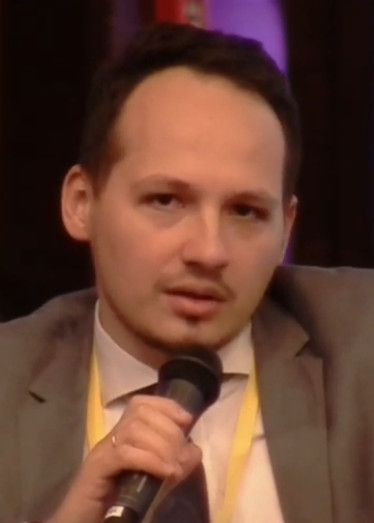
- Yegorov in 2019

Chairman of the Development Bank
- In office 9 March 2021 – 11 March 2024
- Preceded by: Andrei Zhishkevich
- Succeeded by: Sergei Stolyarchuk

Personal details
- Born: 16 June 1986 (age 39)
- Spouse: Anastasia Tsingel (m. 2013)

Alexander Andreevich Yegorov (Russian: Александр Андреевич Егоров; born 16 June 1986) is a Belarusian banker and politician serving as first deputy chairman of the National Bank since 2025. From 2024 to 2025, he served as deputy head of the Presidential Administration. From 2021 to 2024, he served as chairman of the Development Bank. From 2019 to 2021, he served as deputy chairman of Belarusbank.

== Early life and career ==
Yegorov was born in Minsk on 16 June 1986. His father Andrey is an associate professor at the department of higher mathematics and mathematical physics of the Belarusian State University. He studied at the university from 2002 to 2007, and graduated with a degree in mathematical economics. He was a lead specialist for systemic risks at the National Bank from 2007 to 2009, and an economist at the representative office of the International Monetary Fund from 2009 to 2011. He attended Williams College in Massachusetts from 2011 to 2012, and graduated with a Master of Humanities. From 2012 to 2015, he worked at the ministry of economy. In 2013, he married his wife Anastasia. From 2015 to 2021, he worked at Belarusbank.
