= Belkart =

Belarusian payment system

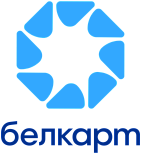
- Company type: Payment system
- Industry: Financial services
- Founded: 1995; 31 years ago
- Founder: Government of Belarus
- Headquarters: Minsk, Belarus
- Owner: National Bank of Belarus
- Website: belkart.by

Belkart (Belarusian: Белкарт) is a Belarusian domestic payment system based on bank payment cards. The Belkart system is an integral part of the payment systems of the Republic of Belarus and is managed by the central bank of Belarus.

As of January 1, 2023, the system has 5.3 million cards in circulation, 23 transactions are made per second and the share of payments by cards of the Belkart system in the non-cash turnover of the country is 56.1%.

== History ==
In March 1994 a decision was made to begin work on creating the Belkart system. On December 30, 1994, a certificate of registration of the Belkart trademark was received. On September 26, 1995, the first operation was made on a Belkart card with a microprocessor.

In the first decade of the 2000s it had been developing within the framework of the Concept of Development of the National Payment System of the Republic of Belarus until 2010, taking into account resolution no. 84 of the National Bank of Belarus issued on May 26, 2004, No. 84. By the end of 2013 the Belkart system had a market share of 46% in the Belarusian payment card market.

On February 11, 2019, the Belkart payment system announced the signing of a cooperation agreement with the Mir payment system. Within the framework of the document, the parties outlined the implementation of the issuance of Belkart cards with a chip, using the technologies of the Russian National Card Payment System. Since January 1, 2020, all Belarusian banks suspended the issuance of Belkart cards and began to offer only joint Belkart-Maestro cards. The reason was the ban on the issuance of new cards with only a magnetic strip (without a chip). Cards with a chip are approximately twice as expensive, which is why it became unprofitable for banks to work with this system (Belkart cards are considered social and are usually offered by default to pensioners, schoolchildren and employees of state enterprises). Since January 14, 2020, the issuance of cards with an EMV chip began.

Since August 11, 2022, the Belkart PAY mobile application for contactless payments using a smartphone (based on Android OS) has been launched. Currently, Belkart cards of six banks are supported: Belarusbank, Belagroprombank, Bank Reshenie, Paritetbank, BTA Bank and Zepter Bank.

== See also ==
- Unified Settlement Information Space
