= Hero of Belarus =

Highest title that can be bestowed on a citizen of Belarus

- Type: Medal
- Awarded for: those who "perform great deeds in the name of freedom, independence and prosperity of the Republic of Belarus".
- Country: Belarus
- Presented by: Belarus
- Ribbon: yes
- Status: Currently awarded
- Established: April 13, 1995
- First award: Uladzimir Karvat

Highlights
- Total awarded posthumously: 4
- Total recipients: 13

Hero of Belarus (Belarusian: Герой Беларусі, Łacinka Hieroj Biełarusi; Russian: Герой Беларуси, romanized: Geroj Belarusi) is the highest title that can be bestowed on a citizen of Belarus. The title is awarded to those "who perform great deeds in the name of freedom, independence and prosperity of the Republic of Belarus". The deed can be for military performance, economic performance or great service to the State and society. The design of the medal is similar to that of its predecessor, Hero of the Soviet Union. Similar titles to the Hero of Belarus include the Hero of the Russian Federation, Hero of Ukraine, and Hero of Uzbekistan. Since its creation, the title has been awarded to eleven people.

== Legislation ==
The title and other Belarusian state awards, their creation, nomination and awarding, are regulated by a set of legal documents: Belarusian Constitution, Law N 288-З "About state awards of the Republic of Belarus" and presidential decrees.

The title was created by the Belarus Supreme Soviet on April 13, 1995, with the passage of Resolution N 3726-XII, titled "System of State Awards for the Republic of Belarus". Alongside the Hero of Belarus title, the resolution authorized the creation of medals, orders, and titles that can be presented by the Belarusian government. The creation of the awards was a way to honor those who have made valuable contributions to Belarus, irrespective of whether they were performed by a citizen or a foreigner.

This resolution was outlawed and replaced by Law N 288-З on May 18, 2004.

== Recommendation process and awarding ==
To be considered for title, a person must perform a deed that greatly benefits the state and Belarusian society at large. The title can be awarded to those serving in the military, public service or private enterprise. It can only be awarded once to an individual, and can be awarded posthumously. The official criteria are stated in Chapter 2, Article 5 of Law N 288-З. Chapter 3, Article 60 of Law N 288-З allows any group (association) of workers to submit a recommendation (petition) for an individual to be awarded the title. Governmental bodies, the National Assembly, the Council of Ministers, cabinet officials and public unions, among others, are also eligible to submit nominations for the title. The candidate is evaluated, and if deemed worthy, the nomination is forwarded to the Council of Ministers and then, after having been allowed by the Governmental Secretariat of the Belarusian Security Council, to the President of the Republic.

Under the Belarus Constitution (Part 4, Chapter 3, Article 84), the President of the Republic has the power to bestow state awards. To announce an award, the President issues a decree conferring the title to a person. Within two months, the title will be presented by the President in a formal setting, usually at the Independence Palace in the capital city of Minsk. A certificate (gramota) will also be presented to the recipient, signed by the President of the Republic.

== Privileges ==
Initially, social privileges for those, who achieved Hero of Belarus, according to the Resolution of the Supreme Council of the Republic of Belarus under April 13, 1995 N 3727-XII, were equal to the privileges for people, whom Hero of Soviet Union, Hero of Socialist Labour, Order of Glory or Order of Labor Glory was given. These privileges are regulated by Resolution of the Supreme Council of the Republic of Belarus under February 21, 1995 N 3599-XII.

Now this question is regulated by Law of the Republic of Belarus under June 14, 2007 N 239-З "About social privileges, rights and guarantees to a definite category of citizens".

According to it, Heroes of Belarus have rights:

- of free supplying with medicines in the list of main medicines, which are given under recipes in hospitals;
- of free production and repairing of dentures in governmental organizations domiciliary and of free supplying with other technical means of rehabilitation in accordance with the Governmental register of technical means of social rehabilitation;
- of pecuniary aid for recovery or, instead of pecuniary aid, of free out-of-turn sanitary-resort recovery;
- of free trip on all kinds of urban transport (except taxi) irrespective of domicile;
- of free trip on the transport (railway, water, auto, but not taxi) of suburban traffic;
- of one free roundtrip by rail, airplane, or truck per year of interurban traffic;
- rent-free housing, utilities, and services within 20 square meters of living space;
- of free home phone installation if the extension of the subscriber line is less than 500 meters;
- of free usage of the home phone (except interurban and international talks).

The consumptions, connected with these privileges, are financed from means of republican and local budgets and of governmental social insurance.

== Construction and display ==
1996–1999 medal

The recipient of the title is given a medal called the Medal of the Hero of Belarus (Belarusian: медаль Героя Беларусі, Russian: медаль Героя Беларуси). The star and suspension are made of gold, and thus it is nicknamed "Gold Star", as was its predecessor, the Hero of the Soviet Union. The star has a total diameter of 33 millimeters, and is attached to a rectangular suspension device (boot tree). In the center of the rectangle is a ribbon of two sections of red and one section of green. The red and green bars on the ribbon evoke the design and colors of the national flag. The amount of gold is set at 585–1 Test, with the total weight of the medal being 19 grams. The present design was enacted into law by Presidential Decree Number 516 on September 6, 1999.

The design of the medal is modeled after one used for the Hero of the Soviet Union. Unlike the Hero of the Soviet Union, Hero of Socialist Labor and the Hero of the Russian Federation titles, there is no engraving on the reverse of the star. The ribbon also copies the Soviet Hero medal's ribbon, since a flag design was also used to make the ribbon of that medal. The medal is always worn in full on the left side of the breast above all other medals and orders. Chapter 4, Article 69 of Law N 288-З states that any awards and titles presented by the Soviet Union and the Byelorussian SSR must be placed after awards from the Republic of Belarus.

=== 1996 medal ===
When the title was created, a suggested medal was drafted and designed by the government. The major difference between this medal and the current medal is the design of the suspension and the star medallion at the bottom: the top suspension is longer than the bottom, and the bottom star is outlined differently and is adorned with rubies. The suspension was made from gold-plated silver, while the suspension of the current medal is made from gold, as the medal. The design of the star evokes the Marshal's Star, which Soviet Marshals wore around their necks. This medal was adopted by Presidential Decree Number 26 on May 15, 1996.

== Recipients ==
=== Awardees ===
Name	Date	Description
Uladzimir Mikalayevich Karvat Уладзімер Мікалаевіч Карват	November 21, 1996	For fatally navigating a test plane which was suffering a technical failure away from populated areas.
Pavel Mariev Павел Лук'янавіч Марыеў	July 29, 2001	For contributions to БелАЗ (Belarusian Automobile Works).
Hero of Socialist Labour Alaksandar Iosifovich Dubko Герой Сацыялістычнай Працы Аляксандар Ёсіфавіч Дубко	July 30, 2001	For contributions to the agricultural development of the Hrodna region.
Michail Alyaksandravich Karchmit Міхаіл Аляксандравіч Карчміт	July 30, 2001	For contributions to the development of agriculture in Nyasvizh Region, Minsk region and for commitment to the Commission for Regional Policy Council.
Vital Kramko Віталь Крамко	July 30, 2001	For contributions to the collective farm "Прагрэс" (Prahres) and Agricultural Production Cooperative "Кастрычнік-Гродна" (Kastryčnik-Hrodna) in Hrodna.
Mikhail Stsiapanavich Vysotski Міхаіл Сцяпанавіч Высоцкі	March 1, 2006	For contributions to the development of the Belarusian Automobile.
Pyotar Piatrovich Prakapovich Пётар Пятровіч Пракаповіч	March 1, 2006	For contributions to the banking system of the Republic of Belarus.
Vasil Apanasavich Ravyaka Васіль Афанасьевіч Равяка	March 1, 2006	For contribution to the Agricultural Production Cooperative "Прагрэс—Верцялішкі" (Prahres-Vierciališki).
Michail Andreyevich Savitsky Міхаіл Андрэевіч Савіцкі	March 1, 2006	For the development of Belarusian art (Painting).
Metropolitan Filaret (Kirill Varfolomeevich Vakhromeev)	March 1, 2006	For contribution to the spiritual revival of the Belarusian people.
Darya Uladzimirauna Domracheva Дар’я Ўладзімераўна Домрачава	February 17, 2014	For high professional skills and exceptional sporting achievements.

The first award in history was given to Uladzimir Karvat (posthumous) in 1996. The first "group awarding" took place on June 30, 2001 to Pavel Mariev, Mikhail Karchmit, Vital Kramko and Alaksandar Dubko (posthumous), while Kirill Vakhromeev, Mikhail Savitsky, Mikhail Vysotsky, Pyotr Prakapovich and Vasil Ravyaka were presented their titles on March 1, 2006.

Uladzimir Karvat, a military pilot, was flying his training aircraft Sukhoi Su-27 on May 23, 1996. The plane caught fire and Karvat was ordered to eject to safety. Unknown to the ground crew, the plane would have crashed in an area full of civilians. Seeing the civilians on the ground, Karvat steered the plane away until it crashed one kilometer from the Brest Region settlements of Arabawshchyna and Vyalikaye Hatsishcha, killing him instantly. President Alexander Lukashenko issued Decree Number 484 on November 21, 1996, which posthumously awarded Karvat the title Hero of Belarus. The crash site has been converted to a memorial for Karvat, where a copy of Lukashenko's decree is on the tail fin of the Sukhoi Su-27p.

Pavel Mariev was awarded the title for his work in the automobile industry as manager of Belarusian Auto Works, a leading producer of Belarusian automobiles.

Vital Kramko and Mikhail Karchmit were awarded for their work in the agriculture industry. Kramko is the chairman of the Grodno Region agricultural collective "October", while Karchmit was the director of the Minsk Region cooperative "Snov" until his death in 2004.

Alaksandar Dubko was posthumously awarded the hero title for his long service to the Belarusian and Soviet governments.

Kirill Vakhromeev, the emeritus Metropolitan of Minsk and Slutsk, the Patriarchal Exarch of All Belarus, was awarded the hero title for his work to restore spirituality among the Belarusian population.

Mikhail Savicki was awarded the hero title for his long contributions to the Belarusian arts and for helping to set up art academies in the republic.

Mikhail Vysotsky was awarded for running the research enterprise "Belavtotraktorostroyeniye", a part of the National Academy of Sciences.

Pyotr Prakapovich was awarded for his work as the chairman of the National Bank of Belarus.

Vasil Ravyaka was awarded for his work at the Grodno Region agricultural co-op "Progress-Vertelishki".

Darya Domracheva was awarded for her progress in biathlon after the 2014 Winter Olympics in Sochi, where Darya won 3 gold medal in personal starts.

On May 19, 2021 lieutenant Nikita Kukonenko and major Andrei Nichiporchik were killed during a Yak-130 training flight in Baranovichi. Their plane crashed near apartment buildings on Rosa Luxemburg Street. Later, the commission investigating the crash said that the pilots tried to take the plane away from homes and therefore ejected late. On November 24, 2021 they were posthumously awarded for courage and heroism shown in the performance of military duty.

== In culture ==
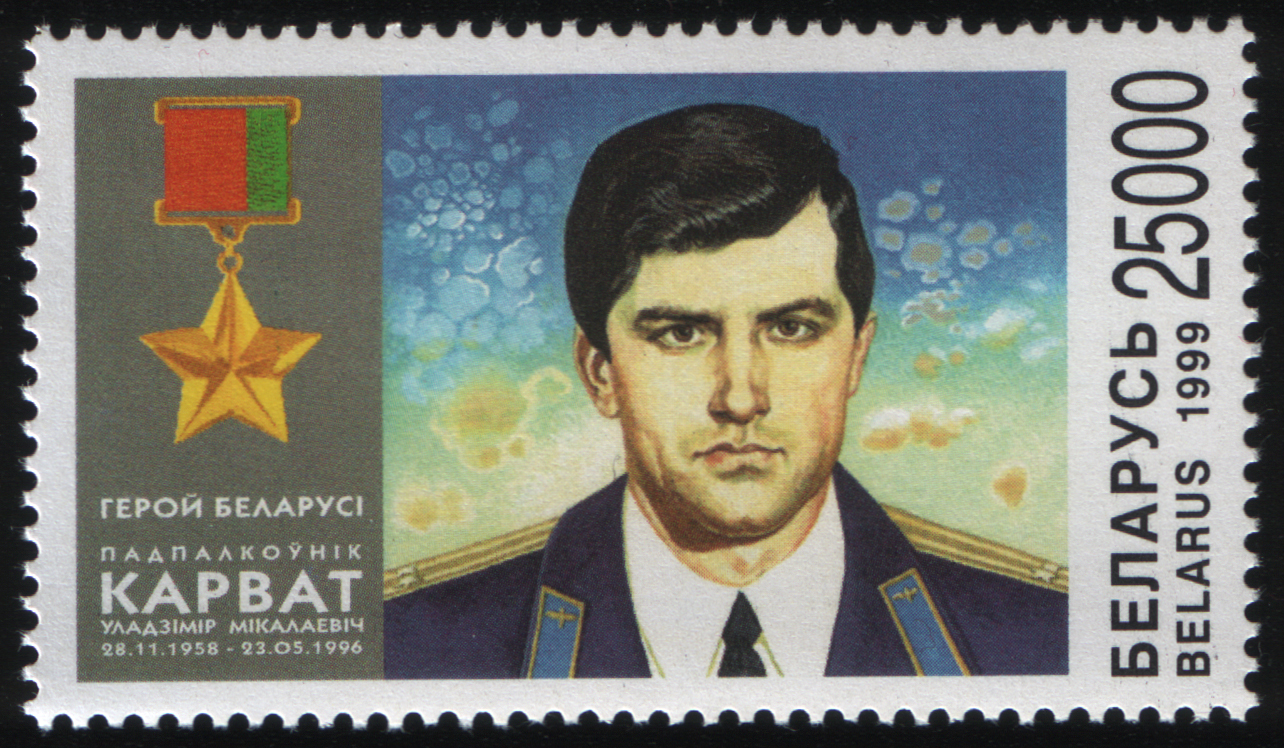
Uladzimir Karvat on stamp of Belarus

The medal was featured on a stamp, released by Belposhta, commemorating the 3rd year of Karvat's death. Designed by V. Volynets, the 25,000 rouble stamp featured the medal on the left and Karvat's photo on the right in full color. In the white text below the medal, it says "Hero of Belarus, Uładzimir Mikalaevič Karvat, (28.11.1958 – 23.05.1996)". It was issued on August 12, 1999, and had a print run of 90,000.

The hero title was also featured in a set of stamps released by BELPOST in December 2006, depicting the state awards of Belarus. On the first issue card, the medal is displayed in full color next to drawings of the state emblem, state flag and the Presidential Palace. A first day postal marking from Minsk also uses an outline of the medal, which is adorned with wreaths and the text "National Decorations of the Republic of Belarus" written in the Belarusian language.

Another set of stamps, devoted to orders and medals of Belarus, was put into circulation by Ministry of Communications and Informatization of Belarus in August 2008. The designers are Ivan Lukin and Oleg Gaiko. The printing is offset and full-color. Paper is chalk-overly and rubberized. The size of stamps are 29,6 × 52 mm.

Television channel "CTV (Minsk)" released a film, devoted to the Heroes of Belarus.

== See also ==
- Gold star
- Hero (title)
- Orders, decorations, and medals of Belarus
- State decoration
