= Belarus and the International Monetary Fund =

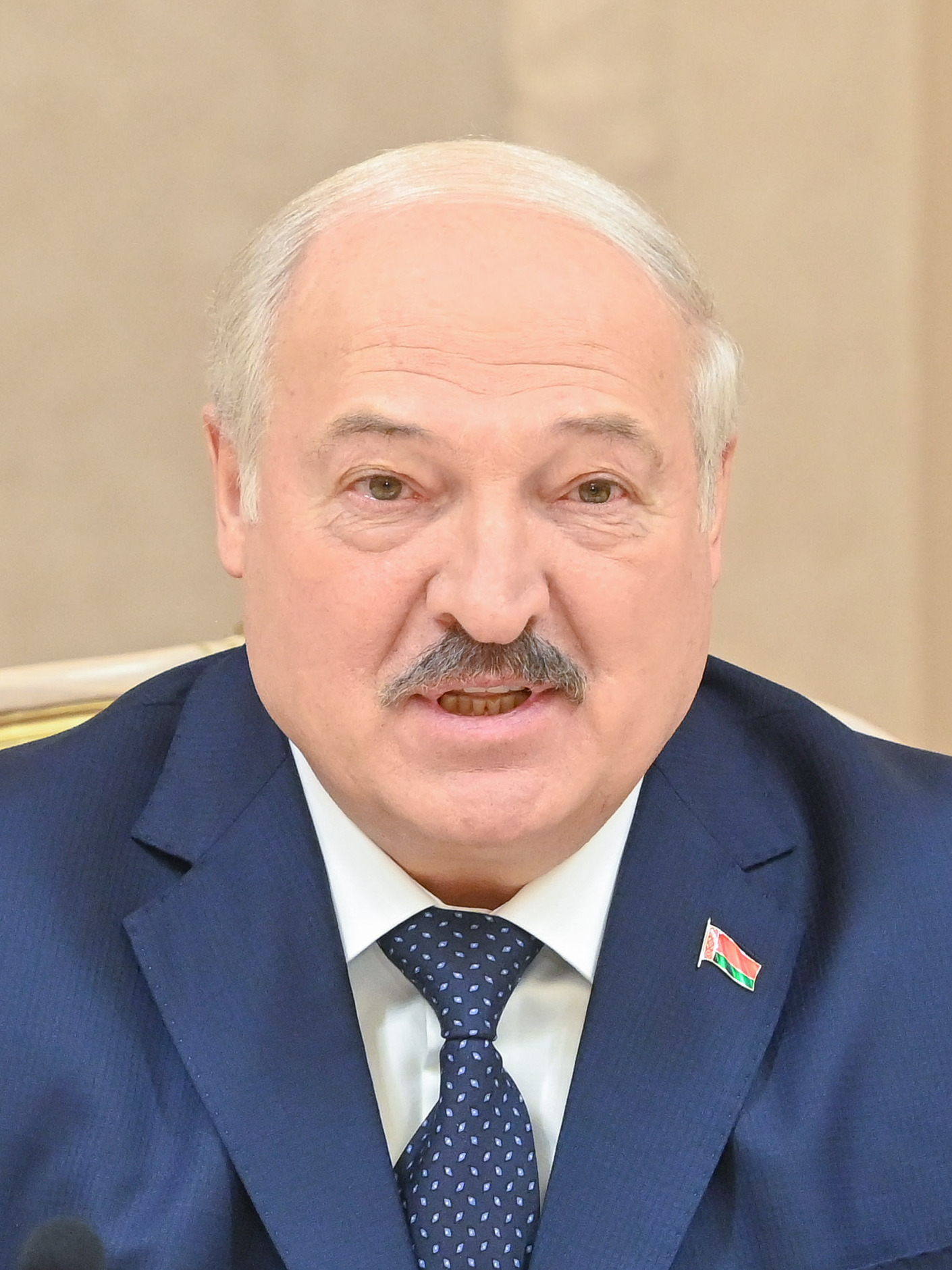
Alexander Lukashenko, President of Belarus since 1994

Belarus and the International Monetary Fund cover the relations between the country of Belarus and the International Monetary Fund. The Republic of Belarus became a member of the International Monetary Fund on July 10, 1992, and has since taken out a significant amount of loans to stabilize its economy, manage the balance of payments and deal with hyperinflation.

Belarus IMF quota is 681.5 millions of special drawing rights (SDR), 0.14% of IMF total. They have 8,280 number of votes, which independently gives them a .16% voting share. As of 2019, Pavel Kallaur held the board of Governor seat.

When it comes to voting power Belarus is grouped in the constituency system consisting of Austria, Czech Republic, Hungary, Kosovo, Slovak Republic, Slovenia, and Turkey- together they have 162,344 total votes with 3.23% percent of fund total. As of 2019, Raci Kaya was the Board of Governor for the constituency system.

== Belarus' economic history ==
Formally known as the Byelorussian Soviet Socialist Republic under the Soviet Union, on July 27, 1990, Belarus demanded its sovereignty. The country officially become the independent Republic of Belarus on August 25, 1991. In 1994 Belarus elected their first president, Alexander Lukashenko. USA and the European Union, deem Belarus the last dictatorship in Europe.

After World War II, the Byelorussian economy was in tatters, and most of the industry and many production plants were transferred to Russia. The Soviet Union made Russia's economy priority before rebuilding Belarus. Under the leadership of Lukashenko, the economy of Belarus had problems with balance of payments and foreign exchange reserves. In 1998 Belarus entered a crisis, with the ruble value halved and food rationing imposed by the government. Belarus went to its neighbor Russia to seek financial help. Belarus and Russia signed an accord in hopes of merging the Russian and Belarusian currencies and tax systems, which was not officially put into effect. As of 2019, Belarus had 10.4 million people and a gross domestic product of US$80 billion. Their exports and imports were imbalanced, imports being at US$33 billion and exports are at US$28.5 billion. Their most lucrative export is refined petroleum, which represents 19% of their total exports and crude petroleum being their highest import – mainly from Russia.

== International Monetary Fund programs and loans ==
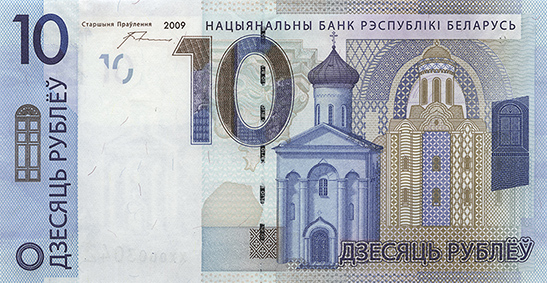
The Belarusian Ruble, the country's current currency

On July 28, 1993, under the Systematic Transformation Facility, 70.1 million SDR's were approved for Belarus in order to help with inflation and the overall quality of life for the people of Belarus. Although Belarus has slowly acquired economic reform and has shown to be resistant, their Parliament approved a comprehensive reform program in October 1994. To support the government's 1995 economic reform program, the IMF approved a second drawing under the Systematic Transformation Facility for again, 70.1 million SDR's (US$103 million).

On September 12, 1995, the IMF approved a stand-by agreement credit of 196 million SDRs (US$293 million). The stand-by agreement was aimed to improve price stability, balance of payments, market economy, private ownership of land, and ultimately remove any barriers against privatization in the business sector. It would help promote foreign investment and lower the inflation problem. However, only the first $70 million of these funds were disbursed. In March 1996, the IMF cited the poor state of market reforms as the reason for withholding the loan. This decision came just one week after Russia and Belarus announced their intention to form an economic union.

In 2005 Belarus paid off its loans, and the institution reported Belarus having a growing economy and inflation fell.

After the 2008 financial crisis, Belarus was severely hit regarding trading, level of reserves, and balance of payments. On January 12, 2009, the IMF approved a US$2.46 billion stand-by agreement loan, which was 418.8% of the Belarus quota. US$787.9 million was first available and the rest was to be paid in quarterly reviews to ensure Belarus was meeting their conditions. On June 29, 2009, the IMF completed their first review of the stand-by agreement and approved a US$679.2 million disbursement after concluding that Belarus was following the agreements. The IMF also approved a loan increase to US$3.52 billion.

In 2011 Belarus was hit with a severe crisis, and the government cut the ruble value against the US dollar by 36% and increased its interest rates and froze prices on certain staple foods. Belarus initially went to Russia for a loan, which Russia wasn't able to provide. Then, they went to the IMF requesting a US$3 billion loan. Lukashenko has publicly spoke out about the IMF imposing political conditions requested in exchange for the loans, such as releasing an activist from jail. The IMF denied this claim insisting they were only able to impose economic reforms, not political. Ultimately, Belarus ended up receiving a US$3 billion loan from the Eurasian Economic Community Anti Crisis Fund.

== Statistics ==
As of 2025, Belarus has engaged with the IMF on two occasions. Initially, in the 1990s, Belarus borrowed approximately $300 million, which was fully repaid by 2005. Following the 2008 crisis, the country again drew on IMF funds, with more than $3 billion credit, a sum that was repaid by 2015.

Belarus use of IMF credit and loans, $ millions
1991	1992	1993	1994	1995	1996	1997	1998	1999	2000	2001	2002	2003
0	0	96.3	102.3	282.7	273.5	256.6	242.6	178.1	114.2	80.8	55.6	26.0
2004	2005	2006	2007	2008	2009	2010	2011	2012	2013	2014	2015	2016
9.1	0	0	0	0	2,871.4	3,495.1	3,484.3	3,021.4	1364.2	79.3	0	0
