= Vasil Ravyaka =

Belarusian politician (1948–2024)

Member of the Council of the Republic for Grodno
- In office 27 October 2008 – 18 October 2012

Personal details
- Born: Vasil Apanasavich Ravyaka; 15 July 1948 Rabets, Khoiniki District, Gomel Oblast, Byelorussian SSR, USSR
- Died: 1 July 2024 (aged 75)
- Party: CPSU (until 1991); Independent (since 1991)
- Education: Grodno State Agrarian University
- Occupation: Farmer

Vasil Apanasavich Ravyaka (Belarusian: Васіль Апанасавіч Равяка; 15 July 1948 – 1 July 2024) was a Belarusian politician. An independent, he served in the Council of the Republic from 2008 to 2012.

Ravyaka died on 1 July 2024, at the age of 75.
