= Pavel Mariev =

Belarusian engineer and politician

Pavel Lukyanovich Mariev (Belarusian: Павел Лук'янавіч Марыеў, Russian: Павел Лукьянович Мариев; born June 16, 1938, in Yaroslavsky District, Yaroslavl Oblast, Russian SFSR) is a current Minister on the Council of the Republic of Belarus. Mariev is also one of five people who have been presented with the title Hero of Belarus. Pavel has a doctorate in the field of technical sciences and is the general manager of the BelAZ plant, located in Zhodzina. Pavel has also been decorated with the title "Merited Worker of Industry of the Republic of Belarus."

Pavel was awarded his Hero of Belarus title from President Alexander Lukashenko on 30 June 2001 for "selfless work and exceptional efforts in the development of domestic automobile construction."
