= Technobank =

Bank of Belarus

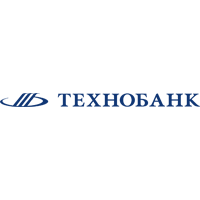
- Type: Government-owned corporation
- Industry: Banking
- Founded: 5 August 1994
- Founder: Government of Belarus
- Headquarters: Minsk, Belarus
- Operating income: 71,668,000 Belarusian ruble (2021)
- Net income: 15,793,000 Belarusian ruble (2021)
- Total assets: 795,773,000 Belarusian ruble (2021)
- Owner: Belarusian Ministry of Finance
- Number of employees: 832 (2021)
- Website: tb.by

Technobank (Belarusian: ААТ Тэхнабанк. Russian: ОАО «Технобанк») is one of the largest banks in Belarus with private Belarusian capital. It belongs to the II group of systemically important banks. Founded in 1994, it is a universal bank which provides comprehensive services and represents the financial interests of all categories of clients.

== History ==
OJSC Technobank was founded on 5 August 1994.

In 2003, CJSC Industrial and Trade Bank joined the bank's structure.

Since 2006, Technobank was the first in Belarus to accept Tax Free checks of the Global Blue and Tax Free Premier systems. It was previously the only full-fledged guarantor of electronic money of the WebMoney Transfer system in Belarus. In 2010, OJSC Belarusian Industrial Bank was merged with OJSC Technobank. In 2013, a license for cash collection activities was obtained.

In 2018, the territorial network of the bank's branches includes 26 branches in all regional cities of Belarus. The bank provides services to small, medium and large businesses, retail customers. The client register of OJSC Technobank includes representatives of business, industry, and services.

In 2006, Technobank began making payments on Tax Free checks. At the moment, the bank accepts payments on Tax Free checks of the following systems: Global Blue, Tax Free Premier, Tax Free Worldwide, Tax Card, Litofolija, Innova Tax Free. In cooperation with the Global Blue system, the bank launched a payment card with the function of express registration of Tax Free Global Card checks.

Technobank was previously the guarantor of WMB electronic money, denominated in Belarusian rubles, and provided a full range of services provided by the WebMoney Transfer payment system for individuals and business clients.

The bank issues and services cards of the Visa International, Belkart and Masterсard payment systems. International settlements are carried out using the SWIFT system.

With the participation of the bank, the shopping malls "Zerkalo" and "Parking" were built in Minsk. From 2008 to 2018, the Bank invested in the construction of the shopping malls "Nemiga 3", "Monetka", "Silhouette", "Secret" (Gomel). In 2017-2018, it was an investor in the shopping and entertainment complex "GREEN CITY" (Minsk).

On October 11, 2018, Dmitry Leonidovich Mikhalevich, Chairman of the Board of Technobank since 2008, died.

In terms of assets in 2019, Technobank took 12th place in the banking services market of the Republic of Belarus.
