= Vital Kramko =

Hero of Belarus (born 1941)

Vital Kramko (born 1941, Belarusian: Віталь Крамко (Крэмко), Russian: Виталий Ильич Кремко) is the chairman of "October" (Октябрь), an agricultural collective located in the Hrodna region. Kramko was awarded the title Hero of Belarus title "for selfless work and valiant efforts in the development of agricultural production." Kramko was awarded the title on 30 June 2001 from a decree issued by Alexander Lukashenko.
