= Uladzimir Karvat =

Belarusian pilot

Uladzimir Mikhailovich Karvat
- Уладзімір Мікалаевіч Карват
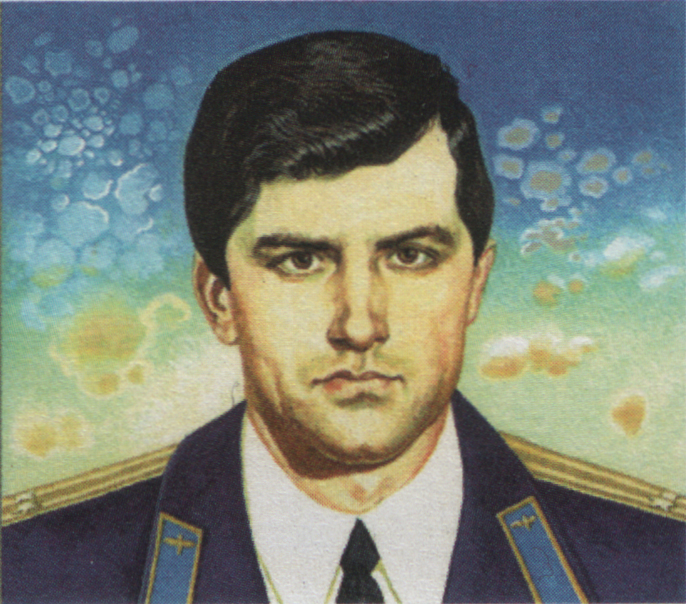
- Karvat on a 1999 Belarusian stamp
- Born: Uladzimir Mikalayevich Karvat; 28 November 1959; Brest, Byelorussian SSR
- Died: 23 May 1996 (aged 36); Near Hacišča, Belarus
- Military career
- Allegiance: USSR; Belarus
- Branch: Soviet Air Force; Belarusian Air Force
- Service years: 1981—1996
- Rank: Lieutenant Colonel
- Commands: An airbase outside of Baranovichi

Uladzimir Mikalayevich Karvat (Belarusian: Уладзімір Мікалаевіч Карват, Russian: Владимир Николаевич Карват, 28 November 1959 – 23 May 1996) was a pilot for the Belarusian Air Force and the first recipient of the title Hero of Belarus.

== Early life and career ==
Karvat was born on 28 May 1959 in the city of Brest in the Byelorussian Soviet Socialist Republic. He joined the Soviet Air Force in 1981 and completed courses at the higher piloting school in Armavir. Afterwards, he was deployed to the Far East of the Russian SFSR. There, Karvat advanced from being a normal pilot, to the commander of a flight training squadron.

He had been awarded the Order for Service to the Homeland in the Armed Forces of the USSR 3rd class and the Jubilee Medal "70 Years of the Armed Forces of the USSR".

In August 1994, three years after the Soviet Union collapsed, he decided to serve in the newly created Armed Forces of Belarus. On 11 September 1994 Karvat took an oath of loyalty to the people of Belarus. He was given the command of a tactical training unit of the 61st airbase in Baranovichi.

== Accident ==
Karvat was honored posthumously for his heroic actions, which took place on 21 November 1996, when his training aircraft (a Sukhoi Su-27p) caught fire. Though he was given the order to eject, the plane was heading directly for a populated area. Keeping that in mind, Karvat steered the plane until it crashed 1 km away from the area of Hacišča, killing him. President Alexander Lukashenko issued Decree Number 484 on 21 November 1996, awarding Karvat with the title Hero of Belarus. The decree stated: "For heroism while in the performance of military duty, we award Lieutenant Colonel Karvat, Uładzimir Mikałajevič the title "Hero of Belarus" (posthumous).
