= Belarusbank =

Belarusian banking and financial services company

Belarusbank Беларусбанк

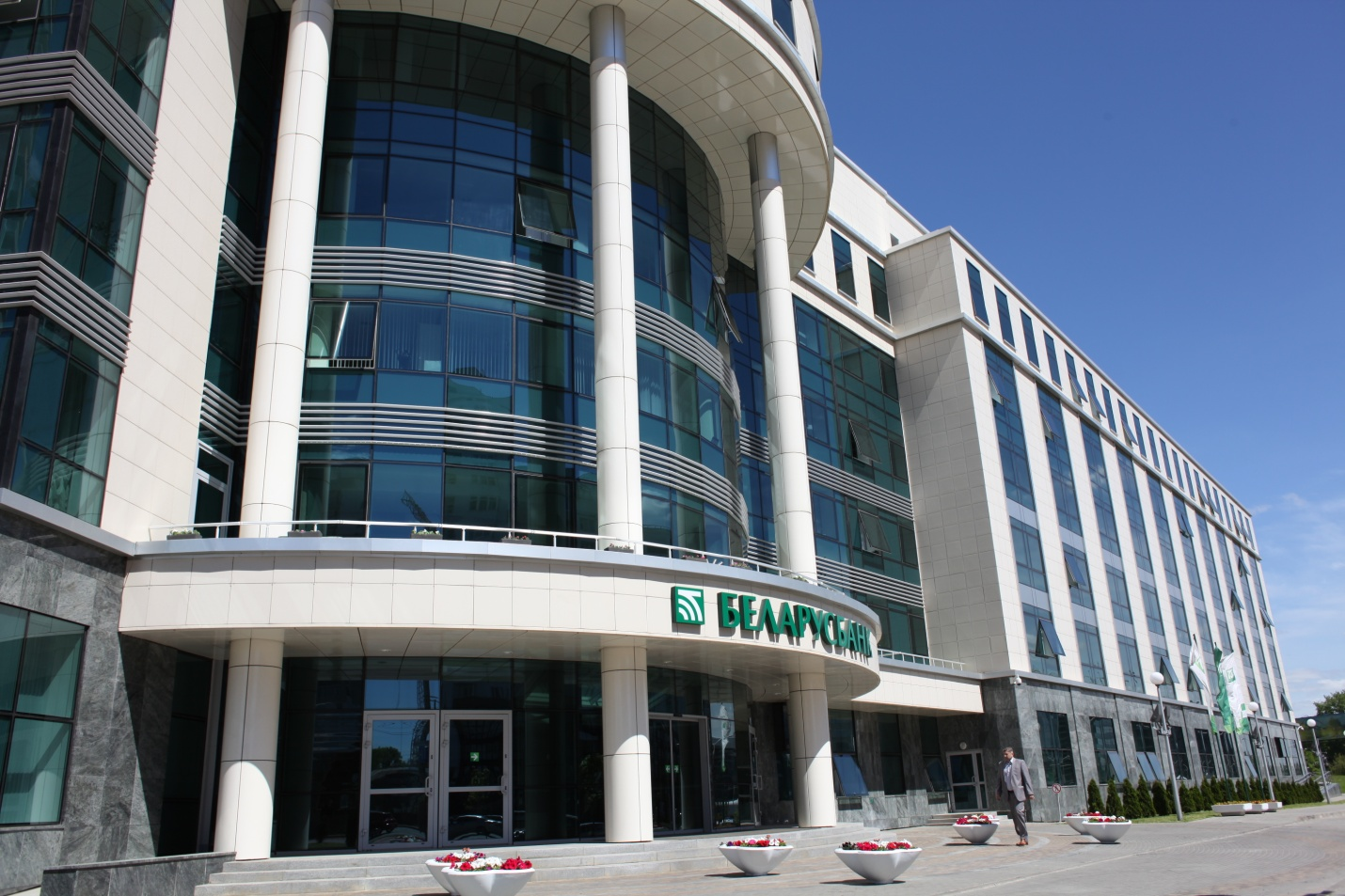
- Type: Public
- Industry: Banking, Financial services
- Founded: 26 December 1922
- Headquarters: Minsk, Belarus
- Key people: Viktar Ananich (Chairman of the Board)
- Products: consumer banking, corporate banking, finance and insurance, investment banking, mortgage loans, private banking, private equity, savings, Securities, asset management, wealth management, Credit cards
- Net income: 385,096,000 Belarusian ruble (2021)
- Total assets: 41,232,922,000 Belarusian ruble (2021)
- Owner: State Property Committee of the Republic of Belarus (98.76%)
- Number of employees: 12,014 (2021)
- Rating: B (Standard & Poor's), B (Fitch) (2017)
- Website: www.belarusbank.by

Savings Bank "Belarusbank" is the largest bank in Belarus that occupies leading positions in the Belarusian banking system by volume of equity, assets, loans, deposits.

== History ==
Opening notice for a labour savings bank in the House of Labour, c. 1923.

From 1922 to 1987 Belarus was integrated in the State Labor Savings Banks System of the USSR. In 1987 Belarusian Republican Bank of the Savings Bank of the USSR was established, and in 1991, it was transformed into Belarusian Savings Bank. In 1995, Joint-Stock Savings Bank Belarusbank was established by Edict of the President of the Republic of Belarus following a nationalizing forced merger between state-owned Belarusian Savings Bank and commercial Bank Belarusbank, with the state holding 99% of the bank's shares.

In 1996 Belarusbank acquired sectoral banks Belsviazbank and Belzheldorbank, furthering nationalization of the banking sector in Belarus. The Client-Bank system was introduced. In the same year the bank became a principal member of Europay International. A year later representative offices in Warsaw, Poland and Moscow, Russia were established.

In 2000 the Bank became a principal member of VISA International.

In 2003 Belarusbank established a representative office in Frankfurt am Main, Germany. In 2005 MinskComplexBank merged into Belarusbank.

In June 2007 Belarusbank became the first Belarusian bank to open a representative office in Beijing. A year later foreign exchange transactions in the currency of the People's Bank of China were introduced.

September 2010 saw the signing of the first three-party Framework Agreement with a French and a Belgian bank in the history of the banking system. Cooperation with banks from more than 30 countries was established, Germany, Switzerland, China, Poland and Turkey being among the leaders. In December the largest syndicated loan in the history of the Belarusian banking system for US$145 million was attracted.

In May 2012 Belarusbank became an official member of World Savings Banks Institute (WSBI), one of the largest banking associations that promotes interests of savings banks and retail banking institutions in the world. In the same year Belarusbank became partner bank of the Shanghai Cooperation Organization Interbank Consortium.

On 16 August 2013 an agreement on founding of Belkart, was signed. Banks Processing Center, JSC, Belarusbank, Belagroprombank, JSC and Belinvestbank, JSC acted as its founders.

In 2015 Belarusbank attracted a record size syndicated loan in the history of the Belarusian banking business in the amount of EUR 203 million.

In 2016 the KGB announced that Belarusbank Senior Deputy Head Henadz Haspadaryk was detained for bribery, and a criminal case opened against him.

In 2016 Belarusbank closed its representative office in Poland, and in 2018 it closed the one in Moscow.

In March 2022, the international hacker group ‘Anonymous’ hacked into the Belarusbank website.

== Owners and management ==
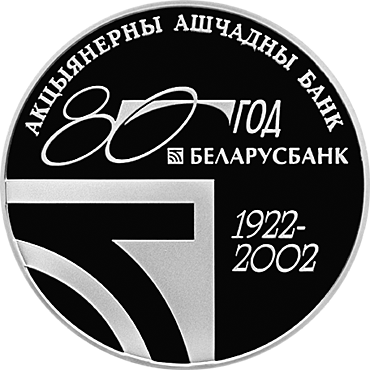
A commemorative coin dedicated to the bank's 80th anniversary, 2002.

Controlling block of the bank's shares is owned by the Republic of Belarus. Majority stake of Belarusbank belongs to the State Property Committee of the Republic of Belarus: 98.76% are owned directly, and 1.19% are owned indirectly (by regional authorities). Individuals own 0.0152% of shares.

Supervisory Board

The supervisory board headed by Alexander Turchin (as of October 2018) performs the coordinating function in the bank.

Chairmen of the Board

- Vladimir Khilko (1993 – 1995)
- Tamara Vinnikova (1995 – 1996)
- Nadezhda Yermakova (1996 – 2011)
- Sergey Pisaryk (2011 – 2016)
- Viktar Ananich (since 2017)

== Operations ==
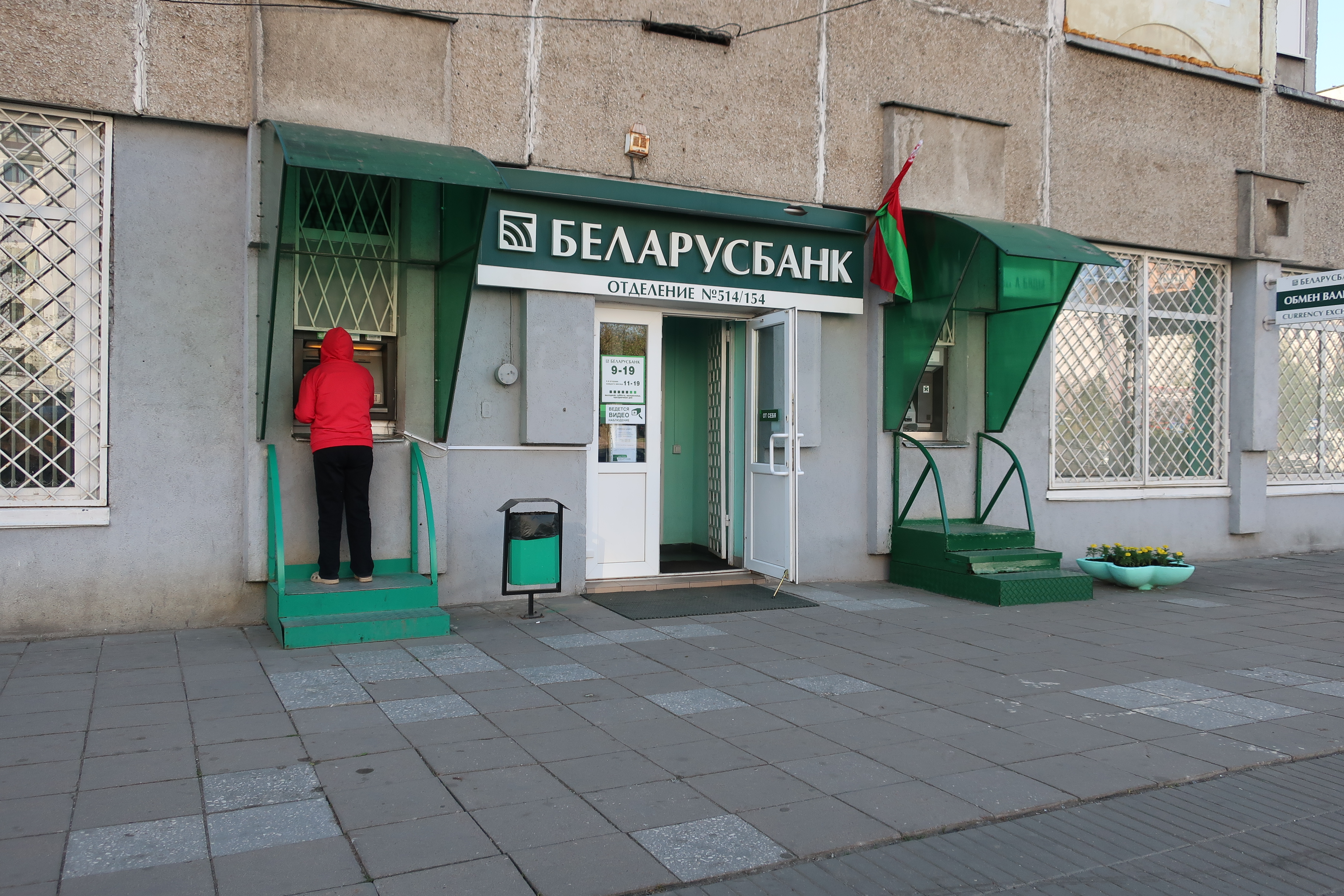
The bank's branch in Minsk, 2019.

Belarusbank is a full-service bank that works with both individuals and entities and also provides investment and banking services. As of August 2018, the bank served more than 80 thousand entities and individual entrepreneurs. Major customers include Belarusian Oil Company, CJSC, Gazprom Transgaz Belarus, JSC, Eurotorg, LLC.

Belarusbank holds the first place among top 10 largest Belarusian banks by the size of branch network. As of 2022 the bank's branch network included:

- 6 regional branches; 21 branches; 119 banking services centers
- 990 banking outlets; 90 exchange offices; 4 mobile cash offices
- 125 operational services

The bank is represented abroad by its representative offices in Beijing and Frankfurt am Main.

Banking holding includes:

- ASB Leasing, LLC (99.99%)
- Unitary Enterprise “ASB Recreation Center Sputnik” (100%)
- Unitary Enterprise “ASB Recreation Center Solnechny” (100%)
- ASB Consult, LLC (60%)
- Unitary Enterprise “ASB Broker“ (founded by ASB Leasing, LLC).

Performance indicators

As of 2018 Belarusbank held the first place in the Belarusian banking system by volume of assets (BYN 27.03 billion). The Bank's income in 2017 amounted to BYN 172 mln.

Funding base of the Bank in 2017 decreased by 1.5% and as of 01.01.2018 comprised BYN 28,658 mln. Loan portfolio of the Bank as of the reporting date amounted to BYN 17,862 mln and comprised 62.3% in the Bank's asset structure.

Belarusbank's share in the total volume of assets of Belarusian banking sector as of 1 January 2016 accounted for 41.2%, in the retail deposit market it reached 45%, loan portfolio amounted to 72% of all outstanding loans to the population.

The volume of credit resources attracted by Belarusbank from foreign banks and financial companies amounts to US$1.8 billion in equivalent. The volume of corporate customer deposits amounts to BYN 79 trillion (EUR 3.89 billion in equivalent). The volume of funds attracted from individuals reached BYN 95 trillion (EUR 4.68 billion in equivalent).

Belarusbank occupies the 420th place in the world.

In 2020 Belarusbank was ranked 52nd in Central and Eastern Europe in terms of assets ($12.6 billion) in the fifth annual ranking of the largest 100 banks in the CEE by the rating agency RIA Rating to Russian news agency RIA Novosti.

== Ratings by rating agencies ==
Fitch Ratings (23 August 2021):

- Fitch withdrew its ratings after sanctions were imposed on the bank sector of Belarus.

Moody's (15 March 2022)

- Ca
- outlook: Negative

Standard & Poor's (April 2022):

- CCC
- watch: Negative

== Samsung Pay and BELARUSBANK Pay ==
On 5 July 2018 Belarusbank together with Samsung Electronics and Mastercard International payment system introduced an opportunity to pay for purchases using the Samsung Pay service for its customers. The service was available to holders of personal Mastercard debit cards of Belarusbank. It was provided free of charge, Internet access was not required to perform a payment, payments with the use of the Samsung Pay service were quicker as compared to ordinary cards.

On 1 March 2018 Belarusbank introduced a mobile payment service Belarusbank Pay for its customers, which allowed holders of Mastercard or Maestro payment cards to perform contactless payments using their mobile phones. The project was carried out in cooperation with the Mastercard payment system. The BELARUSBANK Pay service developed on the basis of the HCE (Host Card Emulation) technology allowed issuing a virtual analogue of a payment card free of charge with the use of a mobile phone (supported by the NFC (Near Field Сommunication) technology and Android operating system, version 4.4 or above) and a mobile application to make payments with one touch of a mobile phone to a contactless mobile terminal at merchants.

On 30 August 2021 Belarusbank announced on its website that from 1 September it would stop supporting the payment service Belarusbank Pay.

== International sanctions ==
In June 2021, the European Union imposed sanctions against Belarusbank. In August of the same year, Switzerland joined the EU sanctions.

Ukraine imposed sanctions against the bank in October 2022, and against ASB Leasing, its subsidiary, in January 2023. In 2022 and 2023, the bank was subject to Canadian sanctions.

== Mortgage office ==
In February 2018 Belarusbank became the first bank in the country to open a mortgage office. It offers customers a set of services referring to receiving real property loans, both for construction and purchase of new residential property, and to buy residential property at the secondary market. The office issues residential loans and provides services required for transaction settlement: selection of accommodations, performance of purchase or execution of a co-investment agreement with a property developer, selection of a mortgage loan and real estate title registration.

== Awards ==
Belarusbank won the following awards for high quality of international wire transfers performance:

- 2012 – Standard Chartered Bank certificate (for high quality execution of payment orders for international wire transfers in the SWIFT format); Deutsche Bank AG (Germany) certificate Deutsche Bank's Straight-Through Processing (STP) Excellence Award (for wire transfers in US dollars);
- 2013 – Standard Chartered Bank (New York, USA) award USD Clearing Certificate of Achievement (for wire transfers), and Commerzbank AG (Germany) award STP Award 2013 (for high quality of payment arrangement via Nostro accounts).
- 2012-2013 – VISA International awarded Belarusbank for good service in the Fewest Fraudulent Transactions nomination.

== See also ==
- Banking in Belarus
