= Football Federation of Belarus =

Governing body of football and futsal in Belarus

UEFA
- Founded: 1989
- Headquarters: Minsk
- FIFA affiliation: 3 July 1992; 33 years ago
- UEFA affiliation: 20 June 1993; 33 years ago
- President: Yauheni Buloichyk
- Website: abff.by/en/

The Football Federation of Belarus (BFF; Belarusian: Беларуская федэрацыя футбола, romanized: Biełaruskaja Fiederacyja Futboła; Russian: Белорусская федерация футбола, romanized: Belorusskaya federatsiya futbola), also known as Belarusian Football Federation, is the governing body of football, beach soccer and futsal in Belarus. It organizes the Belarusian Premier League, Belarusian national football team and the Belarus women's national football team. It is based in Minsk.

== History ==
The Belarusian Football Federation was founded in 1989. In 1992, the FIFA Federation won the right to participate in the World Cup. In 1993, it joined UEFA, which allowed the national team to participate in the European Championships, and Belarusian clubs to participate in the European Cups.

In June 2021, UEFA suspended the Belarusian Football Federation from holding any events and competitions under its auspices. The UEFA national teams and clubs did not play in UEFA tournaments, and previously scheduled UEFA Mini Football Champions League 2021 and UEFA Congress 2021 will be moved to other countries. Previously, the 2021 UEFA European Under-19 Championship, which was planned to be held in Belarus, was cancelled due to the COVID-19 pandemic.

After the 2022 Russian invasion of Ukraine, FIFA and UEFA, the European governing body for football, temporarily suspended Belarusian national and club teams from international competitions, which was later reversed, and UEFA banned Belarus from hosting international competitions.

== Presidents ==
- Evgeny Shuntov (Yawhen Shuntaw, 1989–1999)
- Grigory Fedorov (Ryhor Fyodaraw, 1999–2003)
- Gennady Nevyglas (Henadz Nevyhlas, 2003–2011)
- Sergei Rumas (22 April 2011 – 2019)
- Vladimir Bazanov (Uladzimir Bazanaw, 2019–2023)
- Nikolay Sherstnyov (2023–2025)
- Yauheni Buloichyk (since 2025)
