= Alaksandar Dubko =

Soviet-Belarusian politician

Alaksandar Iosifovich Dubko (Belarusian: Аляксандар Іосіфавіч Дубко, Russian: Александр Иосифович Дубко; January 14, 1938 – February 4, 2001) was the former chairman of the Grodno Regional Executive Committee. In 1960 graduated from the Grodno State Agrarian University with a degree in agronomy. Have worked in different positions in agrarian sector, was a director of one of the biggest agricultural companies in Grodno region. In 1994, he was a candidate for President of Belarus. He also served in the Belarus SSR Supreme Soviet and the USSR Supreme Soviet. He was awarded the titles of Hero of Socialist Labor and Hero of Belarus, however, the Hero of Belarus title was presented to him posthumously for valiant service to state and society.

== Honours and awards ==
- Hero of Belarus (posthumously) for outstanding services to the state and society
- Hero of Socialist Labour (1982)
- Order of the Fatherland, 3rd class
- Two Orders of Lenin
- Order of the Red Banner of Labour
- Order of the Badge of Honour
