= Grodno State Agrarian University =

Public university in Grodno, Belarus

Grodno State Agrarian University – GSAU
- Гродненский государственный аграрный университет (ГГАУ)
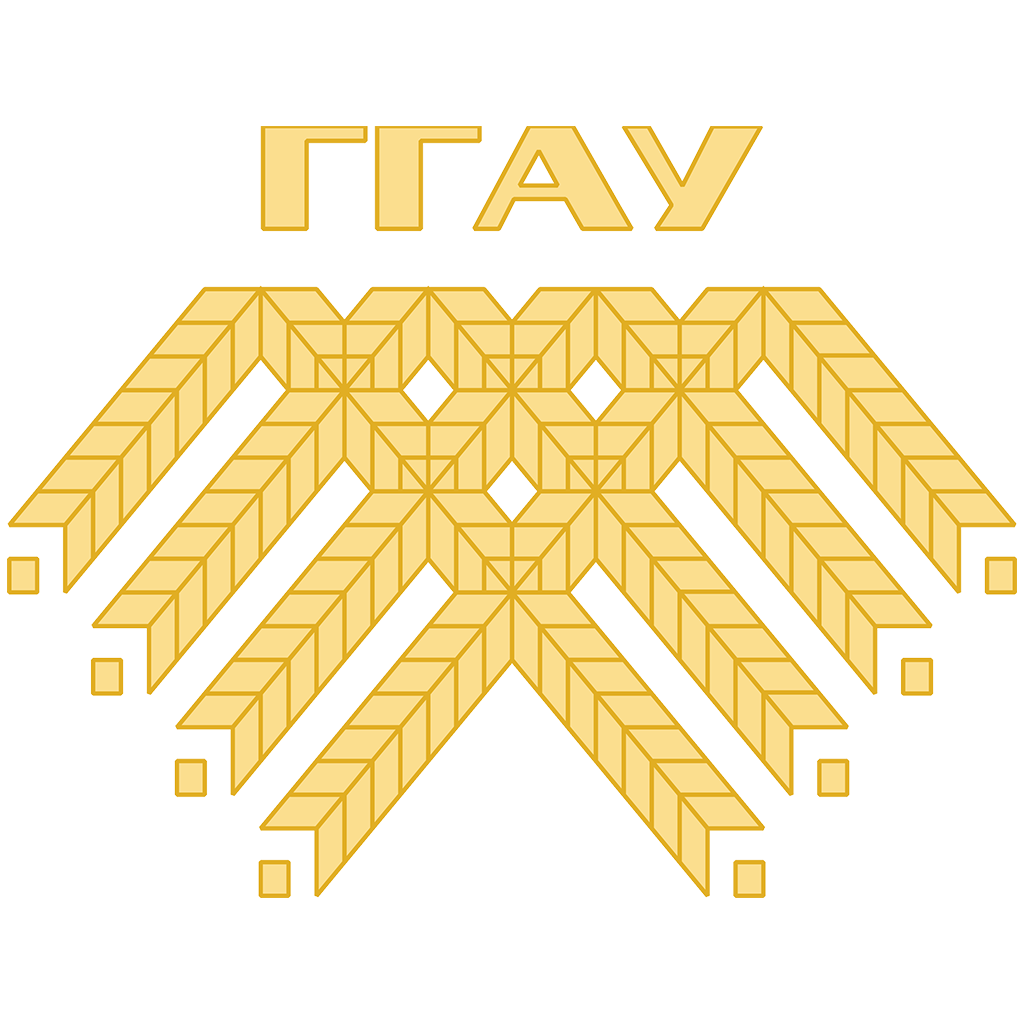
- Type: Public
- Established: January 17, 1951
- Rector: Peshko Valentin
- Administrative staff: 763 (2015)
- Students: 5,150 (2017)
- Address: Tereshkova Str. 28, 230023, Grodno, Grodno, Belarus
- Campus: Urban
- Affiliations: COST, Erasmus Programme, JEAN MONET, FAIR, TEMPUS
- Website: www.ggau.by

The Grodno State Agrarian University (Russian: Гродненский государственный аграрный университет, GSAU) is one of four agricultural universities in Belarus, established in 1951 in Grodno. It employs over 760 staff including over 320 academic educators. The GSAU offers some 13 different fields of study, 7 faculties in Agricultural Sciences, Economic Sciences, Veterinary Medicine, Food Production.

== History ==
On 17 January 1951, the university was founded consisted of Faculty of Agronomy and Faculty of Animal Science (Zootechnical) and one of them was accommodated in Stanislavovo a former summer residence of the last Polish king. In 1962 the Faculty of Plant Protection was founded. During the 90th the rapid growth of the university began because it was still the only one agricultural education establishment for Western part of Belarus.

== Campus ==
The campus (more than 15 ha) is located mostly in the northern center of Grodno, very close to the district of Dzieviatovka.

== Faculties ==
- Agronomical
- Accountancy
- Biotechnology
- Economics
- Food Technology
- Faculty of Plant Protection
- Veterinary Medicine

== Assets ==
- Belarusian Public Association of Veterans
- Virtual Museum

== Notable students and staff ==
- Alaksandar Iosifovich Dubko (1938-2001) was the former chairman of the Hrodna Regional Executive Committee. In 1960 graduated from the Grodno State Agrarian University with a degree in agronomy. Have worked in different positions in agrarian sector, was a director of one of the biggest agricultural companies in Grodno region. In 1994, he was a candidate for President of Belarus.
