= Unified Settlement Information Space =

Belarusian payment system

- Company type: Payment system
- Industry: Financial services
- Founded: 2008; 18 years ago
- Founder: National Bank of Belarus
- Headquarters: Minsk, Belarus
- Operating income: 31,636,000 Belarusian ruble (2021)
- Net income: 9,265,000 Belarusian ruble (2021)
- Total assets: 49,922,000 Belarusian ruble (2021)
- Owner: Non-banking credit and financial organization "ARIP"
- Number of employees: 131 (2021)
- Website: raschet.by

Unified Settlement Information Space (Belarusian: Адзіная разліковая інфармацыйная прастора; Russian: Единое расчетное информационное пространство) is an automated information system of a unified settlement and information space in the Republic of Belarus, designed to accept payments from individuals and legal entities.

== Overview ==
The system was created by the National Bank of the Republic of Belarus and put into operation in 2008. Since 2016, the functioning of the SSIS has been provided by JSC "Non-banking credit and financial organization "SSIS". Information support for the system is provided by JSC "Center for Banking Technologies".

It is possible to pay for utility services, and currently more than 8,000 companies are participants in the system

AIS ARIP allows to make cash payments, payments using bank cards, EasyPay, iPay and WebMoney electronic money in banks participating in the system, as well as via the Internet and SMS banking. Among the system's partners is the payment service ExpressPay The Unified Settlement Information Space acts as the technological basis of the Interbank Identification System which was created in 2016.

In addition, the system includes the following entities:

- AIS "Settlement-Housing", a single republican information system for accounting, calculation and accrual of fees for housing and communal services and fees for the use of residential premises.
- Interbank identification system, a system used to identify customers without their personal presence and provide them with services through digital service channels. Allows for simplified user authentication when performing financial and other transactions.
