= Belinvestbank =

Bank of Belarus

Belarusian Development and Reconstruction Bank "Belinvestbank"
- Type: Government-owned corporation
- Industry: Banking, Financial services
- Founded: 3 September 2001
- Founder: Government of Belarus
- Headquarters: Minsk, Belarus
- Products: consumer banking, corporate banking, finance and insurance, investment banking, mortgage loans, private banking, private equity, savings, Securities, asset management, wealth management, Credit cards
- Net income: 31,387,000 Belarusian ruble (2021)
- Total assets: 5,164,407,000 Belarusian ruble (2021)
- Owner: Belarusian Ministry of Finance
- Number of employees: 2,484 (2019)
- Website: belinvestbank.by

Belarusian Development and Reconstruction Bank "Belinvestbank" (Belarusian: Адкрытае акцыянернае таварыства «Беларускі банк развіцця і рэканструкцыі „Белінвестбанк“»; Russian: Белорусский банк развития и реконструкции «Белинвестбанк») is one of the largest universal banks in the republic, providing a full range of services to legal entities and individuals of various forms of ownership and areas of activity. The bank operates on the basis of a special permit (license issued by the National Bank of the Republic of Belarus). It has a license for the right to carry out professional and exchange activities on securities, issued by the Ministry of Finance of the Republic of Belarus.

== History ==
Open Joint-Stock Company "Belarusian Bank for Development and Reconstruction "Belinvestbank"" was established on September 3, 2001 as a result of reorganization by merging OJSC "Belbusinessbank" and OJSC "Belarusian Development Bank".

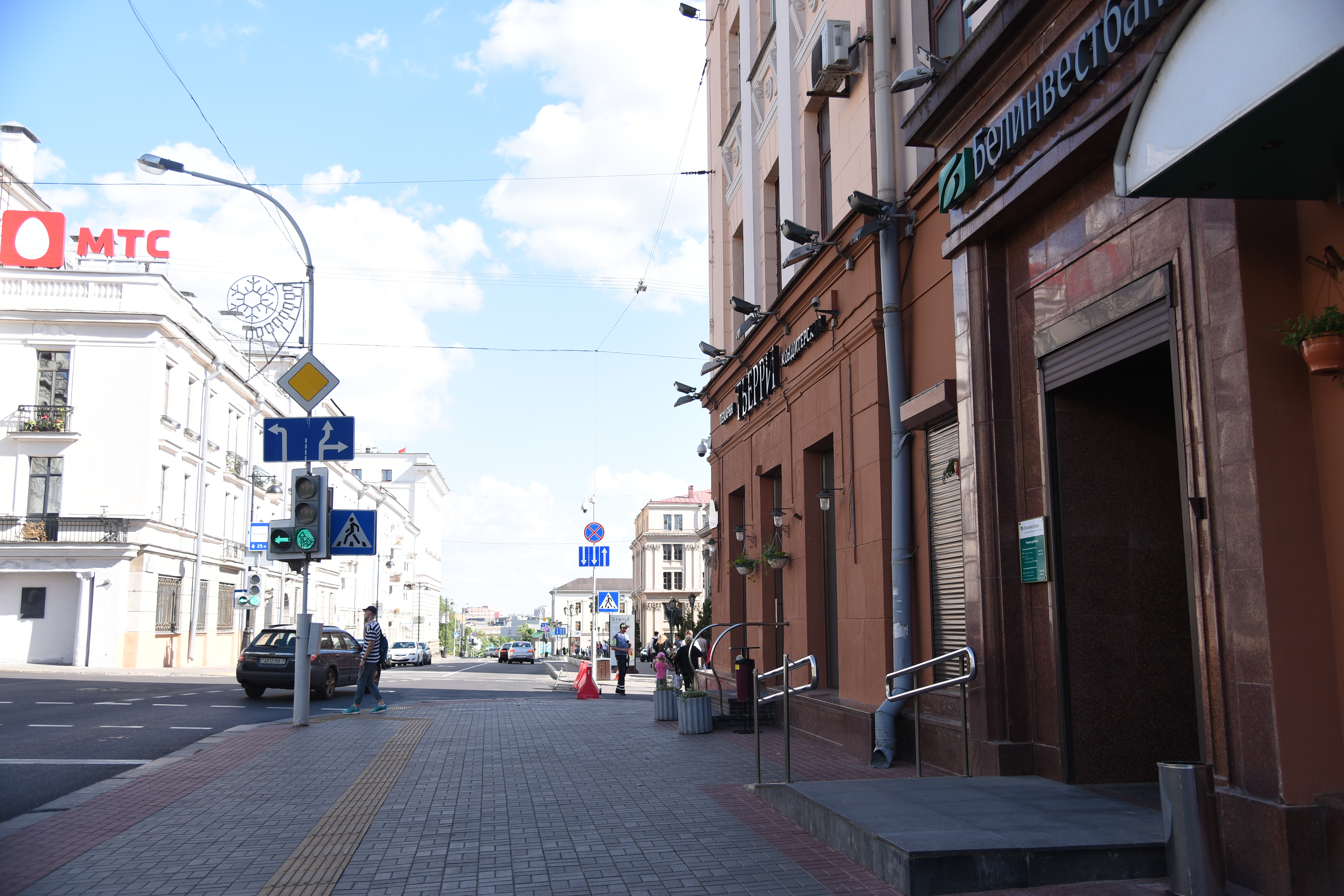
Belinvestbank branch in Lenin Street, Minsk, May 2019

The bank is a member of the Belarusian Chamber of Commerce and Industry, a member of the Association of Belarusian Banks, a member of the Association of Securities Market Participants, a member of the Belarusian Currency and Stock Exchange, an agent of the Government of Belarus in servicing external government loans, a direct participant in the BISS (Belarus Interbank Settlement System) - the interbank settlement system of the National Bank of the Republic of Belarus. Since February 26, 2024, the Bank has been a member of the Association of Trade Finance Professionals with the right to participate in the activities of this organization and cooperate in the field of trade finance and documentary business.

For more than 20 years, the Bank's financial statements have been audited according to international financial reporting standards.

The Bank is one of the largest systemically important banks in the Republic of Belarus, fulfilling the prudential requirements established by the National Bank to ensure the safe functioning of the banking system.

== Operations ==
As of October 1, 2024, the bank served about 34.9 thousand legal entities and individual entrepreneurs, as well as 1.6 million private clients, which is about 17% of the population of Belarus.

The bank continues to develop the service sector based on the use of card technologies, modern remote banking systems, a single settlement and information space.

As of October 1, 2024, the number of payment cards issued by the bank in circulation amounted to more than 1.25 million pieces. The share of bank payment cards of the Belkart payment system is 64 percent.

The regional network of Belinvestbank includes 77 service points.

The acquiring network as of October 1, 2024, included 503 ATMs and 12.2 thousand units of payment equipment in trade and service enterprises.

The expansion and strengthening of the bank's client base in certain market segments is built through the development of cooperation with large enterprises, as well as small and medium-sized businesses. The bank is working to support the development of women's entrepreneurship, including participation in the implementation of the state program "Small and Medium Entrepreneurship" for 2021–2025.

In 2021, the ACRA rating agency assigned Belinvestbank a BB+(RU) rating with a stable outlook on the national scale. The rating was confirmed annually, in 2023 it was raised to BBB-(RU), and in 2024 it was confirmed. At the same time, in 2021, the bank was assigned a B+ rating with a stable outlook on the international scale. This rating is confirmed annually (2022–2024)).

In 2023, following the results of the annual QSA audit, the Bank demonstrated full compliance with the requirements of the PCI DSS (Payment Card Industry Data Security Standard), confirming the high level of technological security of bank payment card data serviced by the bank. In January 2024, the rating agency BIK Ratings confirmed the ESG rating of Belinvestbank OJSC at the A.esg level with a Positive outlook.

== Sanctions ==
In 2022, the bank was included in the sanctions list of all EU countries and disconnected from SWIFT "in response to the fact that Belarus significantly facilitated and supported Russia's invasion of Ukraine, and supported the Russian armed forces".

On February 24, 2022, Belinvestbank and its subsidiaries Belbusinessleasing and Belinvest-Engineering were included in the US sanctions list of specially designated nationals and blocked persons. In March of the same year, legal entities were included in Canada's sanctions list of "associates of the Lukashenko regime" for "facilitating President Putin's invasion of a free and sovereign country". The UK also imposed sanctions against Belbusinessleasing and Belinvest-Engineering. Since October 2022, Belinvestbank, Belbusinessleasing and Belinvest-Engineering have been under sanctions from Ukraine, and since July 2023, under sanctions from New Zealand. Sanctions have also been imposed against the bank by Switzerland and Japan.
