= Master of Humanities =

The Master of Humanities is an interdisciplinary graduate degree which is focused on the humanities (the humanities includes subjects such as history, literature, and philosophy). It is the study of human behavior, practices, and thought. Master of Humanities (MH) degrees have been in existence for at least 40 years; a few online programs exist, as well as traditional on-campus programs offering such degrees.

== Program advantages ==
Many students in MH programs are preparing to teach at the community-college level, enhance their teaching abilities at the high-school level, or are preparing for Ph.D. programs. MH degrees also offer students opportunities in writing and research, government and non-profit work and creative careers.

== Degree programs ==
- Arcadia University (Pennsylvania)
- Braniff Graduate School, University of Dallas
- University of Colorado at Denver
- Mount Saint Mary's University (Los Angeles)
- Old Dominion University (Virginia)
- Tiffin University (Ohio)
- Wright State University (Ohio)
- California State University-Dominguez Hills
- California State University-Northridge
- Wilson College (Pennsylvania)
- American Public University
- University of Texas at Dallas
- Marshall University
- University of Colorado, Denver
- University of Dallas
- Wilson College
- University of Louisville
- University of Chicago
