= Pavel Kallaur =

Pavel Uladzimiravich Kalaur (Belarusian: Павел Уладзіміравіч Калаур), or Pavel Vladimirovich Kallaur (Russian: Павел Владимирович Каллаур; born 1962, Stolin District, Brest Region, Byelorussian Soviet Socialist Republic, USSR) is a Belarusian economist and banker, and the former chairman of the National Bank of the Republic of Belarus from December 2014 to March 2025.

Kallar graduated from Pinsk Tekhnikum of Accounting and Credit (today Palessie State University) and V. V. Kuybyshev Belarusian State Institute of National Economy in Minsk (today Belarusian State Economic University). He worked in Gosbank (State Bank of the USSR) and was gradually promoted to the position of head of its branch in Valozhyn. Since 1988 headed Valozhyn branch of Agroprombank (Agricultural and Industrial Bank of the USSR), after the dissolution of the Soviet Union —of the bank's successor, Belagroprombank (Belarusian Agricultural and Industrial Bank). During 1993- 2010 he was with the National Bank of Belarus, where he was vice-chairman (1993-2009) and first vice-chairman (2009-2010). During 2010-2014 he was head of the Bank BelVEB Bank, the Belarusian branch of the Russian Vnesheconombank.

On 27 December 2014 he was appointed head of the National Bank of the Republic of Belarus. He was relieved of his duties on 10 March 2025.
