= Pyotr Prakapovich =

Belarusian construction engineer and politician

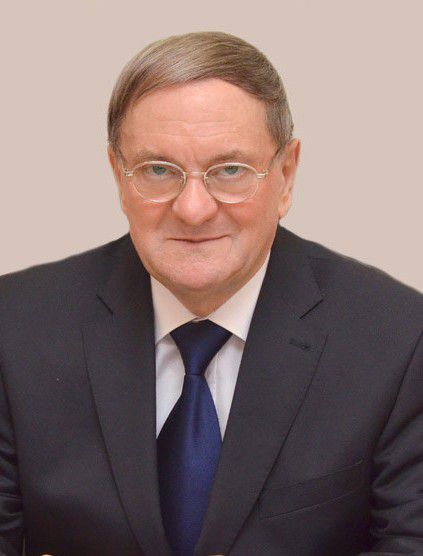
- Prakapovich in 2011

Chairman of the National Bank of the Republic of Belarus
- In office 1998–2011

Personal details
- Born: 3 November 1942 (age 83)

Pyotar Piatrovich Prakapovich (Belarusian: Пётaр Пятровіч Пракаповіч, romanized: Piotar Piatrovič Prakapovič Russian: Пётр Петрoвич Прокопoвич, romanized: Pjotr Petrovič Prokopovič; born 3 November 1942) is a Belarusian construction engineer, politician, statesman and central banker. He was the chairman of the National Bank of the Republic of Belarus from 1998 to 2011. He is a recipient of a number of state awards, including the title of honor Hero of Belarus (2006).
