= Priorbank =

Belarusian private bank

- Type: Privately held company
- Industry: Financial services
- Founded: January 20, 1989; 37 years ago
- Headquarters: Minsk, Belarus
- Area served: Belarus
- Products: Banking services, finance, insurance, mortgage loans, private banking, and wealth management
- Net income: 184,323,000 Belarusian ruble (2021)
- Total assets: 6,228,597,000 Belarusian ruble (2021)
- Number of employees: 1,744 (2021)
- Parent: Soven 1 Holding Limited
- Website: priorbank.by

Priorbank (Belarusian: Адкрытае акцыянернае таварыства «Пріорбанк») is a Belarusian commercial bank that as of 2022 was one of the largest commercial banks in Belarus and the largest private bank in the country. In 2022 the bank had a market share of 6.6%.

== History ==
The bank was established on January 20, 1989 as Minsk Innovation Bank, a joint venture of several large industrial concerns, Minsk Tractor Works, Minsk Automobile Plant, MZH, MZVT and "Gorizont". In 1991 it changed its name to Priorbank.

In 1997, one of the main shareholders became the European Bank for Reconstruction and Development, which sold its shareholding in 2008.

In 2003, 50% of the shares were acquired by the Austrian banking group Raiffeisen Bank International, later its share increased to 87.7%.

Since April 2023, the bank has been under Canadian sanctions in response to the Russian invasion of Ukraine and support provided by the bank to Russia.

In 2024, Priorbank's assets increased by 6.2% to 8.67 billion Belarusian rubles. The bank's equity increased by 30.2% to 2.13 billion Belarusian rubles. Return on capital was 22.8%, and return on assets was 5.6%. The bank received 484.1 million Belarusian rubles in net profit, which is almost a sixth of the total profit of commercial banks in Belarus (excluding the Development Bank).

In September 2024, Raiffeisen Bank International sold its stake in Priorbank to an unknown company from the UAE as part of a deal to get out of its investments due to the banks links to supporting the Russian invasion of Ukraine.
