= Belgazprombank =

Belarusian bank owned by Gazprom

Belgazprombank (Russian: Белгазпромбанк; Belarusian: Белгазпрамбанк, Łacinka: Biełhazprambank) is a Belarus-based bank owned by Gazprom and Gazprombank (49.8 percent each). Its assets amounted to BYN 5bn at the end of 2019.

The bank was established in 1990 and was initially known as "Ekorazvitie".

In 2020, the National Bank of Belarus appointed a temporary administration to the bank after the country's State Control Committee opened cases against board members.

Both Gazprom and Gazprombank refused to cooperate with the temporary administration.

The standoff began after Belgazprombank head Viktar Babaryka announced that he would run for president of Belarus.

In 2023, Canada and Ukraine added the bank to their sanctions lists.
