= Belagroprombank =

Belarusian state-owned bank

- Company type: Government-owned corporation
- Industry: Banking
- Founded: 3 September 1991
- Founder: Government of Belarus
- Headquarters: Minsk, Belarus
- Operating income: 465,005,000 Belarusian ruble (2021)
- Net income: 76,952,000 Belarusian ruble (2021)
- Total assets: 13,753,619,000 Belarusian ruble (2021)
- Owner: State Property Committee of Belarus
- Number of employees: 5,129 (2021)
- Website: belapb.by

Belagroprombank (Belarusian: Белаграпрамбанк; Russian: Белагропромбанк) is a Belarusian joint-stock commercial bank owned by the state. As of 2018, it is the second largest bank in the system by assets. The bank is under EU sanctions since summer 2021.

== History ==
Belagroprombank was registered as one of the first Belarusian joint-stock banks on 3 September 1991. Since 1995, it has been a participant in the securities market. In 2000, it was renamed Open Joint-Stock Company "Belagroprombank".

In August 2010, Belagroprombank was the first Belarusian bank to implement a quality management system for servicing individuals and was certified for compliance with the requirements of the STB ISO 9001 standard.

On 24 June 2021, the bank was added to the EU sanctions list. The EU sanctions include restrictions on borrowing on EU markets and the availability of loans with a maturity of more than 90 days from European counterparties. In August of the same year, Switzerland joined these sanctions.

In March 2022, the bank was sanctioned by Japan, and the EU cut it off from SWIFT "in response to Belarus's significant assistance and support for Russia's invasion of Ukraine and its support for the Russian armed forces". Switzerland and Ukraine soon joined this package of European sanctions. On April 11, 2023, to further pressure Putin's accomplices in Belarus, the Prime Minister of Canada announced additional sanctions against nine entities linked to the Belarusian financial sector, including Belagroprombank.
