= National Bank of the Republic of Belarus =

Central Bank of Belarus

Coordinates: 53.9001°N 27.5589°E

National Bank of the Republic of Belarus Нацыянальны банк Рэспублікі Беларусь (Belarusian) Национальный банк Республики Беларусь (Russian)
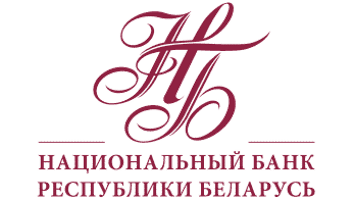

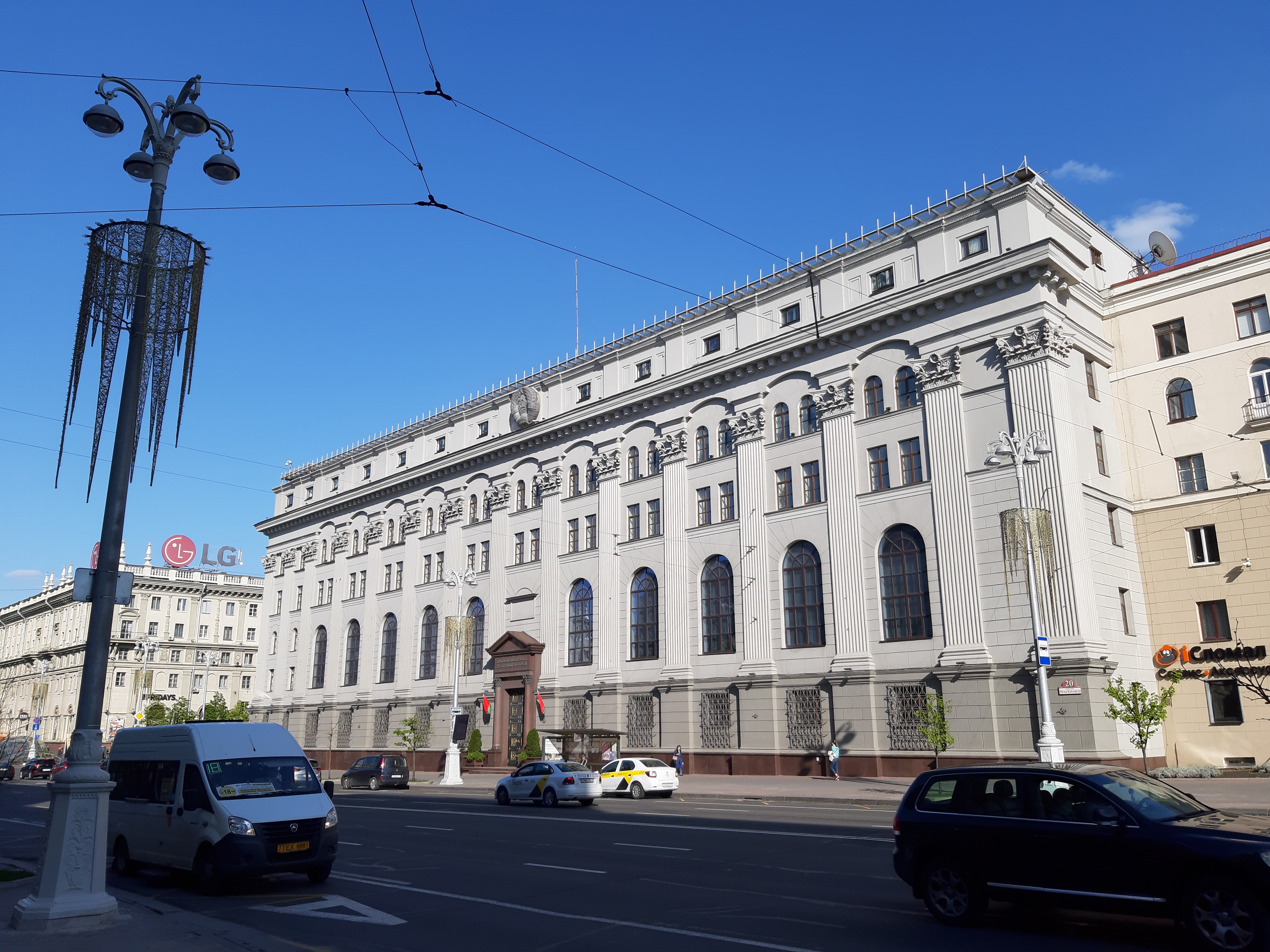
- Central bank of: Belarus
- Headquarters: Minsk, Belarus
- Established: 1992
- Ownership: 100% state ownership
- Chairman: Roman Golovchenko
- Currency: Belarusian ruble BYN (ISO 4217)
- Reserves: US$2.23 billion
- Bank rate: 9.75%
- Website: www.nbrb.by

The National Bank of the Republic of Belarus (NBRB; Belarusian: Нацыянальны банк Рэспублікі Беларусь; Russian: Национальный банк Республики Беларусь) is the central bank of Belarus, located in Minsk. The bank was created in 1922 under the name of "Belarusian Republican Bank" by the Soviet of People's Commissars of Byelorussia, but soon worked under the direction of the State Bank of the USSR. Undergoing reorganizations in 1959 and 1987, the bank appeared in its current form in 1990 after the passage of banking rules upon declaring independence from the Soviet Union.

== History ==
By the decree of the Council of People's Commissars of the BSSR of December 3, 1921, the Byelorussian office of the State Bank of the RSFSR was established under the People's Commissariat of Finance of the Byelorussian SSR. The office began its activity on January 3, 1922. A year later, immediately after the establishment of the State Bank of the USSR, the bank became part of the banking system of the USSR. The bank was reorganized in 1959 and 1987.

Minutes of the board meeting on monetary policy and staff pay, signed by Stanislav Bogdankevich, 26 July 1991.

The history of the independent existence of the banking system of Belarus and the National Bank began with the country's acquisition of sovereignty after the collapse of the Soviet Union. In December 1990, the BSSR adopted the Laws "On Banks and Banking Activities in the Byelorussian SSR", which entered into force on January 1, 1991. All bank institutions on the territory of Belarus were declared its property, and the National Bank was created on the basis of the Belarusian Republican Bank of the State Bank of the USSR. On April 1, 1991, the formation of the National Bank was completed. In 2008 the National Bank created the Unified Settlement Information Space.

In April 2023, the National Bank of Belarus was added to the sanctions list of Canada.

== Legal Framework ==
National Bank is accountable to the President of the Republic of Belarus.

== Financial inclusion ==
The National Bank of the Republic of Belarus is developing policies to promote financial inclusion and is a member of the Alliance for Financial Inclusion. The institution made a Maya Declaration Commitment on 3 May 2013 where it outlined a quantifiable commitment to increase the number of adults with bank accounts from its current level of 70 percent to 85 percent by 2015. Additionally, the bank said it will seek to strengthen financial literacy efforts through specific activities set to be implemented under the Joint Action Plan of Government Agencies and Financial Markets Participants on Improving Financial Literacy of the Population of the Republic of Belarus for 2013–2018.

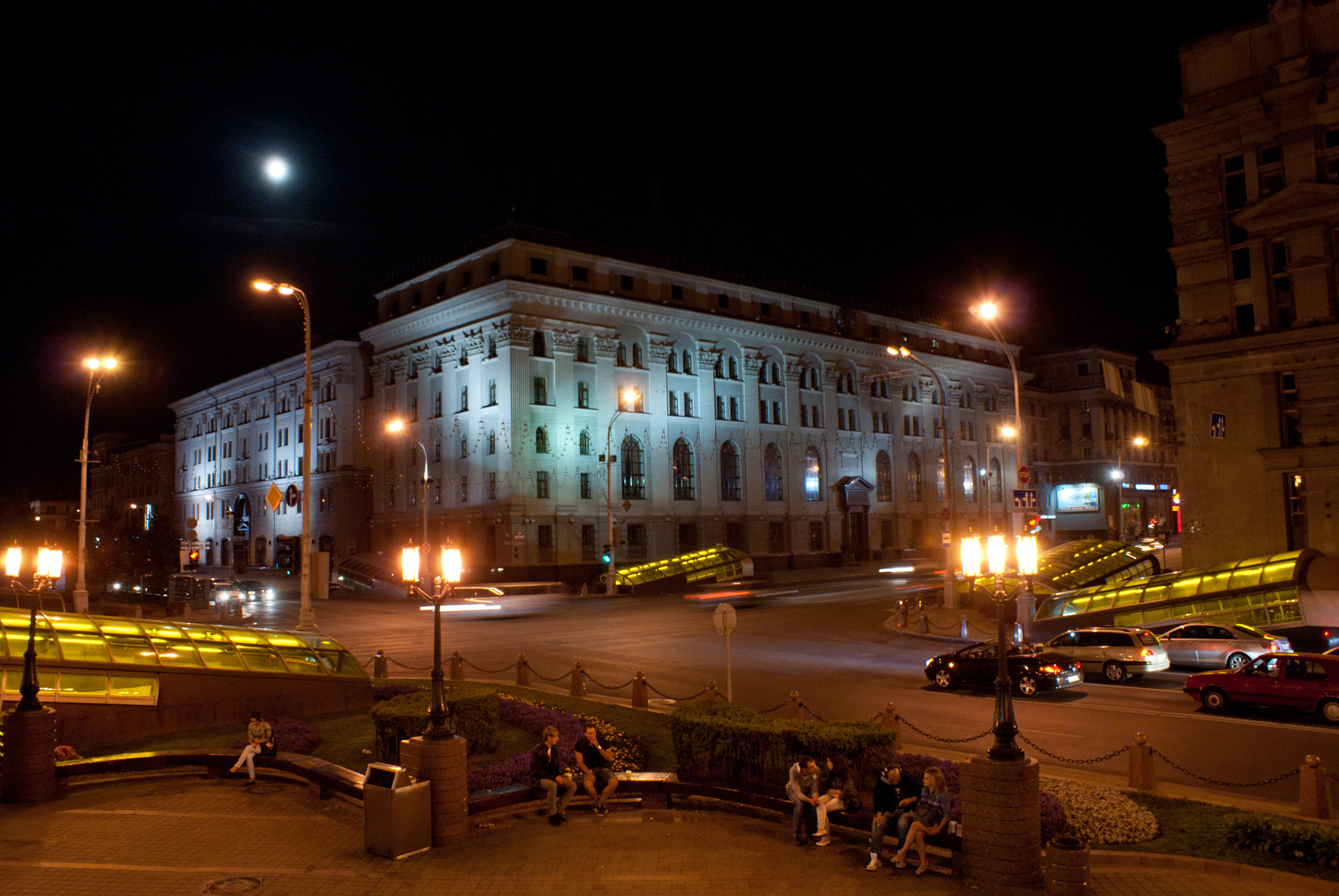
NBRB

== Chairmen of the National Bank ==
- Nikolai Omelyanovich (in Belarusian: Mikalai Amelyanovich; 1986, as Belkontora of Gosbank–1991)
- Stanislav Bogdankevich (in Belarusian: Stanislau Bahdankev; 1991–1995)
- Tamara Vinnikova (in Belarusian: Tamara Vinnikava; 1996–1997)
- Gennady Aleynikov (in Belarusian: Hyenadz' Aleynikau; 1997–1998)
- Pyotr Prakapovich (in Belarusian: Pyotr Prakapovich; 1998–2011)
- Nadezhda Yermakova (in Belarusian: Nadzeya Yermakova; 2011–2014)
- Pavel Kallaur (Belarusian: Павел Уладзіміравіч Калаур), or Pavel Vladimirovich Kallaur (Russian: Павел Владимирович Каллаур (2014–2025)
- Roman Golovchenko (Belarusian: Раман Аляксандравіч Галоўчанка) (since 2025)

== See also ==
- Belarusian Ruble
- Economy of Belarus
- Economy of Europe
- List of central banks
- List of banks in Belarus
- List of financial supervisory authorities by country
