= Social Security debate in the United States =

Discussion of proposals to change the U.S. Social Security system

The Social Security debate in the United States encompasses benefits, funding, and other issues. Social Security is a social insurance program officially called "Old-age, Survivors, and Disability Insurance" (OASDI), in reference to its three components. It is primarily funded through a dedicated payroll tax. During 2015, total benefits of $897 billion were paid out versus $920 billion in income, a $23 billion annual surplus. Excluding interest of $93 billion, the program had a cash deficit of $70 billion. Social Security represents approximately 40% of the income of the elderly, with 53% of married couples and 74% of unmarried persons receiving 50% or more of their income from the program. An estimated 169 million people paid into the program and 60 million received benefits in 2015, roughly 2.82 workers per beneficiary. Reform proposals continue to circulate with some urgency, due to a long-term funding challenge faced by the program as the ratio of workers to beneficiaries falls, driven by the aging of the baby-boom generation, expected continuing low birth rate, and increasing life expectancy. Program payouts began exceeding cash program revenues (i.e., revenue excluding interest) in 2011; this shortfall is expected to continue indefinitely under current law.

In 2009, Social Security had collected approximately $2.8 trillion more in payroll taxes and interest than have been paid out since tax collection began in 1937. This surplus, which has since been partly spent down, is referred to as the Social Security Trust Fund. The fund contains non-marketable Treasury securities backed "by the full faith and credit of the U.S. government". The funds borrowed from the program are part of the total national debt of $18.9 trillion as of December 2015. Due to interest, the Trust Fund will continue increasing through the end of 2020, reaching a peak of approximately $2.9 trillion. Social Security has the legal authority to draw amounts from other government revenue sources besides the payroll tax, to fully fund the program, while the Trust Fund exists; however, payouts greater than payroll tax revenue and interest income over time will liquidate the Trust Fund by 2035, meaning that only the ongoing payroll tax collections thereafter will be available to fund the program. As of early 2026, this estimate was updated to late 2032.

There are certain key implications to understand under current law, if no reforms are implemented:

- Estimates in 2025 showed that payroll taxes will only cover about 77% of the scheduled payout amounts from 2033 and beyond (this figure was later updated to late 2032). Without changes to the law, Social Security would have no legal authority to draw other government funds to cover the shortfall.
- Between 2021 and 2035, redemption of the Trust Fund balance to pay retirees will draw approximately $3 trillion in government funds from sources other than payroll taxes. This is a funding challenge for the government overall, not just Social Security; however, as the Trust Fund is reduced, so is that component of the national debt, and the Trust Fund amount is in effect replaced by public debt outside the program.
- The present value of unfunded obligations under Social Security was approximately $11.4 trillion over a 75-year forecast period (2016–2090). In other words, that amount would have to be set aside in 2016 so that the principal and interest would cover the shortfall for 75 years. The estimated annual shortfall averages 2.49% of the payroll tax base or 0.9% of gross domestic product (a measure of the size of the economy). Measured over the infinite horizon, these figures are 4.0% and 1.4%, respectively.
- The annual cost of Social Security benefits represented 4.0% of GDP in 2000 and 5.0% GDP in 2015. This is projected to increase gradually to 6.4% of GDP in 2035 and then decline to about 6.1% of GDP by 2055 and remain at about that level through 2086.

President Barack Obama opposed privatization (i.e., diverting payroll taxes or equivalent savings to private accounts) or raising the retirement age, but supported raising the annual maximum amount of compensation that is subject to the Social Security payroll tax ($137,700 in 2020) to help fund the program. In addition, on February 18, 2010, President Obama issued an executive order mandating the creation of the bipartisan National Commission on Fiscal Responsibility and Reform, which made ten specific recommendations to ensure the sustainability of Social Security.

Federal Reserve Chairman Ben Bernanke said on October 4, 2006: "Reform of our unsustainable entitlement programs should be a priority ... the imperative to undertake reform earlier rather than later is great." The tax increases or benefit cuts required to maintain the system as it exists under current law are significantly higher the longer such changes are delayed. For example, raising the payroll tax rate to 15% during 2016 (from the current 12.4%) or cutting benefits by 19%, or eliminating the annual maximum amount of compensation that is subject to the Social Security payroll tax, would address the program's budgetary concerns indefinitely; these amounts increase to 16% and 21% respectively if no changes are made until 2034. During 2015, the Congressional Budget Office reported on the financial effects of various reform options.

== Background on funding challenges ==
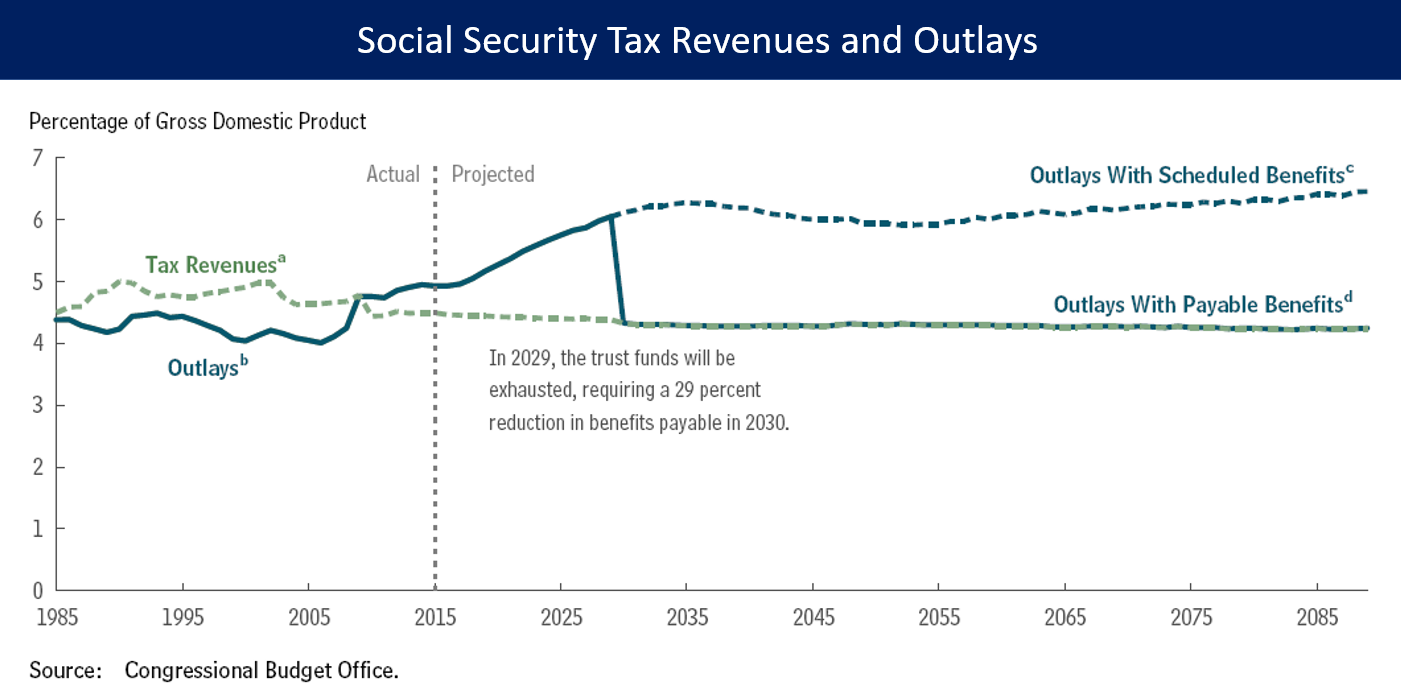
U.S. Congressional Budget Office forecast of Social Security tax revenues and outlays from 2015 to 2085. Under current law, the outlays are projected to exceed revenues, requiring a 29% reduction in program payments starting around 2030 once the Social Security Trust Fund is exhausted.

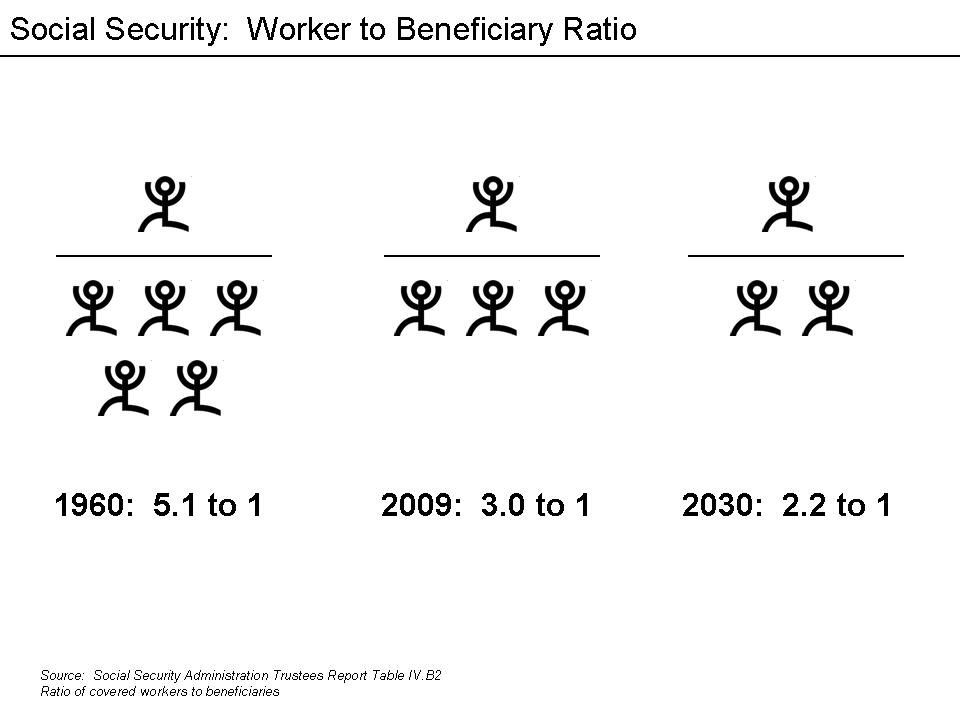
Social Security – Ratio of Covered Workers to Retirees

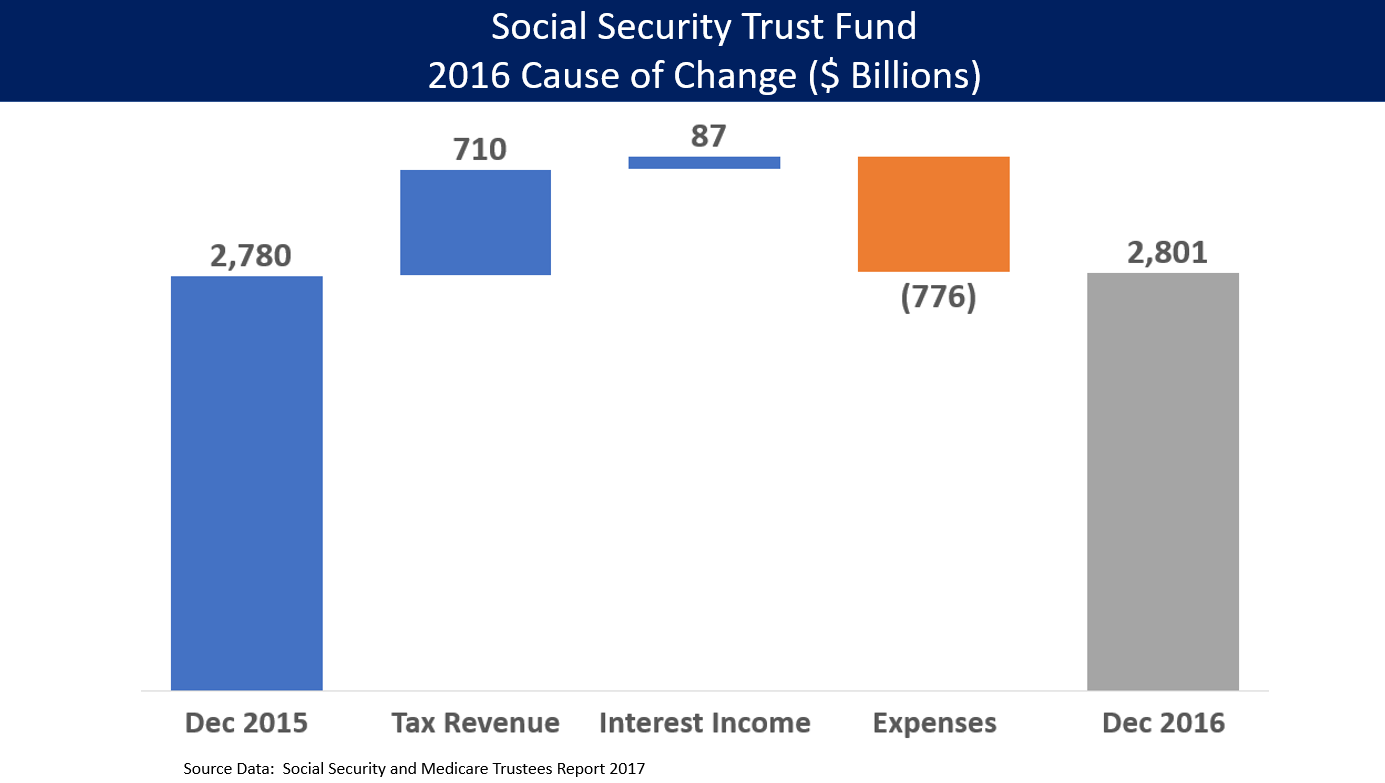
U.S. Social Security Trust Fund: Payroll taxes and revenues add to the fund, while expenses (payouts) reduce it.

=== Overview ===
Social Security is funded through the Federal Insurance Contributions Act tax (FICA), a payroll tax. Employers and employees are each responsible for making tax payments of 6.2% of wages in 2018 (12.4% total) as FICA contributions, typically withdrawn from paychecks. Non-employee contractors are responsible for the entire 12.4%. During 2018, Social Security taxes were levied on the first $128,400 of income for employment; amounts earned above that are not taxed. Covered workers are eligible for retirement and disability benefits. If a covered worker dies, his or her spouse and children may receive survivors' benefits. Social Security accounts are not the property of their beneficiary and are used solely to determine benefit levels. Social Security funds are not invested on behalf of beneficiaries. Instead, current tax receipts are used to pay current benefits (the system known as "pay-as-you-go"), as is typical of some insurance and defined-benefit plans.

In each year since 1983, tax receipts and interest income have exceeded benefit payments and other expenditures, in 2009 by more than $120 billion. However, without further legislation, or change in benefits, this annual surplus will change to a deficit around 2021, when payments begin to exceed receipts and interest thereafter. The fiscal pressures are due to demographic trends, where the number of workers paying into the program continues declining relative to those receiving benefits.

=== Demographics ===
The number of workers paying into the program was 5.1 per retiree in 1960; this declined to 3.3 in 2007 and is projected to decline to 2.1 by 2035. Furthermore, life expectancy continues to increase, meaning retirees collect benefits longer. Federal Reserve Chairman Bernanke has indicated that the aging of the population is a long-term trend, rather than a proverbial "pig moving through the python".

The number of program recipients was 60.9 million in 2016, up approximately 0.9 million from 2015. The number receiving retirement benefits rose by 1.2 million, while the number receiving survivors and disability benefits fell by a total of approximately 0.3 million.

=== Social Security Trust Fund ===
Social Security payroll taxes and interest received are added to the Fund, while expenses (payments to recipients) are deducted from the Fund. For example, during 2016, the initial balance as of January 1 was $2,780 billion. An additional $710 billion in payroll tax revenue and $87 billion in interest added to the Fund during 2016, while expenses of $776 billion were removed from the Fund, for a December 31, 2016 balance of $2,801 billion (i.e., $2,780 + $710 + $87 − $776 = $2,801).

The accumulated surpluses are invested in special non-marketable Treasury securities (treasuries) issued by the U.S. government, which are deposited in the Social Security Trust Fund. At the end of 2009, the Trust Fund stood at $2.5 trillion. The $2.5 trillion amount owed by the federal government to the Social Security Trust Fund is also a component of the U.S. National Debt, which stood at $15.7 trillion as of May 2012. By 2017, the government had borrowed nearly $2.8 trillion against the Social Security Trust Fund.

Projections were made by the Board of Trustees of the Federal Old-Age and Survivors Insurance and Federal Disability Insurance Trust Funds (OASDI) in their 71st annual report dated May 13, 2011. Expenses exceeded tax receipts in 2010. The Trust Fund is projected to continue to grow for several years thereafter because of interest income from loans made to the US Treasury.

However, the funds from loans made have been spent along with other revenues in the general funds in satisfying annual budgets. At some point, however, absent any change in the law, the Social Security Administration will finance payment of benefits through the net redemption of the assets in the Trust Fund. Because those assets consist solely of U.S. government securities, their redemption will represent a call on the federal government's general fund, which for decades has been borrowing the Trust Fund's surplus and applying it to its expenses to partially satisfy budget deficits. To finance such a projected call on the general fund, some combination of increasing taxes, cutting other government spending or programs, selling government assets, or borrowing would be required.

Payroll tax rates were cut during 2011 and 2012 as a stimulus measure; these cuts expired at the end of 2012. The Social Security Trustees estimated the amounts at $222 billion total; $108 billion in 2011 and $114 billion in 2012. Transfers of other government funds made the program "whole" as if these tax cuts had not occurred.

In May 2024, the annual trustees report was released with depletion date projections for the funds estimated at 2033 and 2098 respectively and by 2035 when combined however, as of June 2026, it was estimated that the Social Security Trust Fund would be depleted by late 2032 and therefore reduced payments would begin at that time unless Congress acts to improve the situation. At that point, under current law, the system's benefits would have to be paid from the FICA tax alone. Revenues from FICA are projected at that point to be continue to cover about 77% of projected Social Security benefits if no change is made to the current tax and benefit schedules. In a survey of 210 members of the American Economics Association published in November 2006, 85 percent agreed with the statement: "The gap between Social Security funds and expenditures will become unsustainably large within the next fifty years if current policies remain unchanged."

=== Effect of unemployment on program funding ===
Increasing unemployment due to the subprime mortgage crisis of 2008–2010 has significantly reduced the amount of payroll tax income that funds Social Security. Further, the crisis also caused more to apply for both retirement and disability benefits than expected. During 2009, payroll taxes and taxation of benefits resulted in cash revenues of $689.2 billion, while payments totaled $685.8 billion, resulting in a cash surplus (excluding interest) of $3.4 billion. Interest of $118.3 billion meant that the Social Security Trust Fund overall increased by $121.7 billion (i.e., the cash surplus plus interest). The 2009 cash surplus of $3.4 billion was a significant reduction from the $63.9 billion cash surplus of 2008.

=== Effect of income inequality on program funding ===
Rising income inequality also affects the funding of the Social Security program. The Center for Economic and Policy Research estimated in February 2013 that upward redistribution of income is responsible for about 43% of the projected Social Security shortfall over the next 75 years. This is because income over the payroll tax cap ($127,200 in 2017) is not taxed; if individuals generate higher income above the taxable income limit, that lack of additional taxation results in lower funding than possible if there were no income limit.

The Social Security Administration explained in 2011 that historically, an average of roughly 83% of covered earnings have been subject to the payroll tax. In 1983, this figure reached 90%, but it has declined since then. As of 2010, about 86% of covered earnings fall under the taxable maximum.

=== Size of funding challenge ===
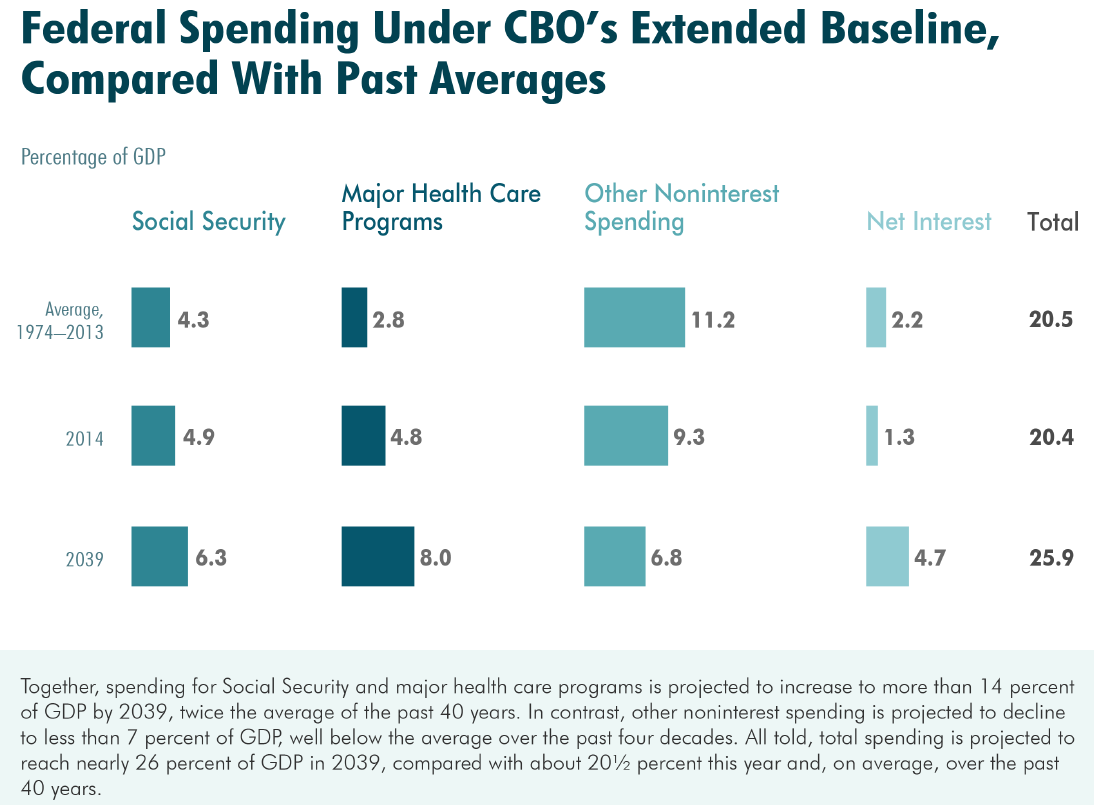
Spending for Social Security is projected to rise relative to GDP, while discretionary programs decline.

The CBO projected in 2010 that an increase in payroll taxes ranging from 1.6–2.1% of the payroll tax base, equivalent to 0.6–0.8% of GDP, would be necessary to put the Social Security program in fiscal balance for the next 75 years. In other words, raising the payroll tax rate to about 14.4% during 2009 (from the current 12.4%) or cutting benefits by 13.3% would address the program's budgetary concerns indefinitely; these amounts increase to around 16% and 24% if no changes are made until 2037. The value of unfunded obligations under Social Security during FY 2009 was approximately $5.4 trillion. In other words, this amount would have to be set aside today such that the principal and interest would cover the shortfall over the next 75 years. Projections of Social Security's solvency are sensitive to assumptions about rates of economic growth and demographic changes.

The Center on Budget and Policy Priorities wrote in 2010: "The 75-year Social Security shortfall is about the same size as the cost, over that period, of extending the 2001 and 2003 tax cuts for the richest 2 percent of Americans (those with incomes above $250,000 a year). Members of Congress cannot simultaneously claim that the tax cuts for people at the top are affordable while the Social Security shortfall constitutes a dire fiscal threat."

=== Effect on the budget deficit ===
Because Social Security tax receipts and interest exceed payments, the program also reduces the size of the annual federal budget deficit commonly reported in the media. For example, CBO reported that for fiscal year 2012, the "On-budget Deficit" was $1,151.3 billion. Social Security and the Post Office are considered "Off-Budget". Social Security had an estimated surplus of $62.4 billion by CBO accounting (different from the $54 billion reported by the Trustees) and the Post Office had a deficit of $0.5, resulting in a "Total Budget Deficit" of $1,089.4 billion. This latter figure is the one commonly reported in the media.

== Framing the debate ==
=== Ideological arguments ===
Ideology plays a major part of framing the Social Security debate. Key points of philosophical debate include, among others:

- degree of ownership and choice among investment alternatives in determining one's own financial future;
- the right and extent of government taxation and wealth redistribution;
- trade-offs between social insurance and wealth creation;
- whether the program represents (or is perceived as) a charitable safety net (entitlement) or earned benefits; and
- intergenerational equity, meaning the rights of those living today to impose burdens on future generations.

Retirees and others who receive Social Security benefits have become an important bloc of voters in the United States. Indeed, Social Security has been called "the third rail of American politics"—meaning that any politician sparking fears about cuts in benefits by touching the program endangers his or her political career. The New York Times wrote in January 2009 that Social Security and Medicare "have proved almost sacrosanct in political terms, even as they threaten to grow so large as to be unsustainable in the long run".

=== Conservative ideological arguments ===
Conservatives and libertarians argue that Social Security reduces individual ownership by redistributing wealth from workers to retirees and bypassing the free market. Social Security taxes paid into the system cannot be passed to future generations, as private accounts can, thereby preventing the accumulation of wealth to some degree. According to the Cato Institute, a libertarian think tank, private accounts have a much higher rate of return than Social Security accounts. Conservatives tend to argue for a fundamental change in the structure of the program. Conservatives also argue that the U.S. Constitution does not permit the Congress to set up a savings plan for retirees (leaving this authority to the states), although the U.S. Supreme Court ruled in Helvering v. Davis that Congress had this authority.

=== Liberal ideological arguments ===
Liberals argue that government has the obligation to provide social insurance, through mandatory participation and broad program coverage. During 2004, Social Security constituted more than half of the income of nearly two-thirds of retired Americans. For one in six, it is their only income.Liberals tend to defend the current program, preferring tax increases and payment modifications.

Economist Lawrence Summers wrote in August 2016 that raising the Social Security payouts could reduce the savings rate, as the economy faced a post-crisis savings surplus, which was driving down interest rates: "...[A]t current interest rates an increase in pay as you go social security could provide households with higher safe returns than private investments. More generous Social Security would likely reduce the saving rate, thereby raising the neutral interest rate [the rate required to achieve full employment] with no change in budget deficits."

=== Pro-privatization arguments ===
The conservative position is often pro-privatization. There are countries other than the U.S. that have set up individual accounts for individual workers, which allow workers leeway in decisions about the securities in which their accounts are invested, which pay workers after retirement through annuities funded by the individual accounts, and which allow the funds to be inherited by the workers' heirs. Such systems are referred to as 'privatized.' Currently, the United Kingdom, Sweden, and Chile are the most frequently cited examples of privatized systems. The experiences of these countries are being debated as part of the current Social Security controversy.

In the United States in the late 1990s, privatization found advocates who complained that U.S. workers, paying compulsory payroll taxes into Social Security, were missing out on the high rates of return of the U.S. stock market (the Dow averaged 5.3% compounded annually for the 20th century). They likened their proposed "Private Retirement Accounts" (PRAs) to the popular Individual Retirement Accounts (IRAs) and 401(k) savings plans. But in the meantime, several conservative and libertarian organizations that considered it a crucial issue, such as The Heritage Foundation and Cato Institute, continued to lobby for some form of Social Security privatization.

=== Anti-privatization arguments ===
The liberal position is typically anti-privatization. Those who have taken an anti-privatization position argue several points (among others), including:

- Privatization may not address Social Security's long-term funding challenges. The program is "pay as you go", meaning current payroll taxes pay for current retirees. Diverting payroll taxes (or other sources of government funds) to fund private accounts would drive enormous deficits and borrowing ("transition costs").
- Privatization converts the program from a "defined benefits" plan to a "defined contribution" plan, subjecting the ultimate payouts to stock or bond market fluctuations;
- Social Security payouts are indexed to wages, which historically have exceeded inflation. As such, Social Security payments are protected from inflation, while private accounts might not be;
- Privatization would represent a windfall for Wall Street financial institutions, who would obtain significant fees for managing private accounts.
- Privatization in the midst of the greatest economic downturn since the Great Depression would have caused households to have lost even more of their assets, had their investments been invested in the U.S. stock market.

== Chronology of prior reform attempts and proposals ==
- A roots of partial reform attempts or proposal of social security may be able to go trace back the 1930s when institutions are established.
- October 1997 – The Democratic president, Bill Clinton, and the Republican Speaker of the House, Newt Gingrich, reached a secret agreement to reform Social Security. The agreement required both the President and the Speaker to forge a centrist coalition by persuading moderate members of Congress from their respective parties to compromise.
- January 1998 – Progress on the reform agreement reached on October 28, 1997, between Bill Clinton and Newt Gingrich was derailed by the Clinton–Lewinsky scandal approximately a week before Clinton was to announce the initiative in his State of the Union address.
- March 1999 – Republican Senators Spencer Abraham and Pete Domenici circulate the first of a series of "lock box" proposals. These proposals would amend each house's rules, declaring it out of order to consider any bill that would contribute to a Social Security deficit unless a majority or supermajority votes to suspend the rules. All of these proposals failed, but Vice President Al Gore would make the "lock box" concept a part of his presidential campaign program in 2000.
- February 2005 – Republican President George W. Bush outlined a major initiative to reform Social Security which included partial privatization of the system, personal Social Security accounts, and options to permit Americans to divert a portion of their Social Security tax (FICA) into secured investments. In his 2005 State of the Union Address, Bush discussed the potential bankruptcy of the program. Democrats opposed the proposal. Bush campaigned for the initiative in a 60-day national tour. However, public support for the proposal only declined. The House Republican leadership tabled Social Security reform for the remainder of the session. In the 2006 midterm elections, Democrats gained control of both houses, effectively killing the plan for the remainder of Bush's term in office.
- December 2011 – Democratic President Obama's National Commission on Fiscal Responsibility and Reform proposed the "Bowles-Simpson" plan for making the system solvent. It combined increases in the Social Security payroll tax and reductions in benefits, starting several years in the future. It would have reduced benefits for upper-income workers while raising them for those with lifetime earnings averaging less than $11,000 a year. Republicans rejected the tax increases and Democrats rejected benefit cuts. A powerful network of elderly and liberal organizations and union workers also fought any changes.

== Alternate views ==
Advocates of major change in the system generally argue that drastic action is necessary because Social Security is facing a crisis. In his 2005 State of the Union speech, President George W. Bush indicated that Social Security was facing "bankruptcy". In his 2006 State of the Union speech, he described entitlement reform (including Social Security) as a "national challenge" that, if not addressed timely, would "present future Congresses with impossible choices – staggering tax increases, immense deficits, or deep cuts in every category of spending".

A liberal think tank, The Center for Economic and Policy Research, says that "Social Security is more financially sound today than it has been throughout most of its 69-year history" and that Bush's statement should have no credibility.

In 2004 Nobel Laureate economist Paul Krugman, deriding what he called "the hype about a Social Security crisis", wrote:

[T]here is a long-run financing problem. But it's a problem of modest size. The [CBO] report finds that extending the life of the Trust Fund into the 22nd century, with no change in benefits, would require additional revenues equal to only 0.54 percent of G.D.P. That's less than 3 percent of federal spending—less than we're currently spending in Iraq. And it's only about one-quarter of the revenue lost each year because of President Bush's tax cuts—roughly equal to the fraction of those cuts that goes to people with incomes over $500,000 a year. Given these numbers, it's not at all hard to come up with fiscal packages that would secure the retirement program, with no major changes, for generations to come.

The Trust Fund, under current law (blue) and under privatization (red) as per "Model 2" considered in the 2001 commission report (graph from "Social Security Trust Fund" by zFacts.com)

President Ronald Reagan stated in October 1984: "Social Security has nothing to do with the deficit...Social Security is totally funded by the payroll tax levied on employer and employee. If you reduce the outgo of Social Security that money would not go into the general fund to reduce the deficit. It would go into the Social Security trust fund. Therefore, Social Security has nothing to do with balancing a budget or erasing or lowering the deficit."

The claims of the probability of future difficulty with the current Social Security system are largely based on the annual analysis made of the system and its prospects and reported by the governors of the Social Security system. While such analysis can never be 100% accurate, it can at least be made using different probable future scenarios and be based on rational assumptions and reach rational conclusions, with the conclusions being no better (in terms of predicting the future) than the assumptions on which the predictions are based. With these predictions in hand, it is possible to make at least some prediction of what the future retirement security of Americans who will rely on Social Security might be. It is worth noting that James Roosevelt, former associate commissioner for Retirement Policy for the Social Security Administration, claims that the "crisis" is more a myth than a fact.

The Social Security public trustees including Charles Blahous warned in May 2013 that the "window for effective action" to take place was "rapidly closing", with less favorable options available to rectify the problems as time passes.

Proponents of the current system argue if and when the Trust Fund runs out, there will still be the choice of raising taxes or cutting benefits, or both. Advocates of the current system say that the projected deficits in Social Security are identical to the "prescription drug benefit" enacted in 2002. They say that demographic and revenue projections might turn out to be too pessimistic—and that the current health of the economy exceeds the assumptions used by the Social Security Administration.

These Social Security proponents argue that the correct plan is to fix Medicare, which is the largest underfunded entitlement, repeal the 2001–2004 tax cuts, and balance the budget. They believe a growth trendline will emerge from these steps, and the government can alter the Social Security mix of taxes, benefits, benefit adjustments and retirement age to avoid future deficits. The age at which one begins to receive Social Security benefits has been raised several times since the program's inception.

== Studies of Social Security policy alternatives ==
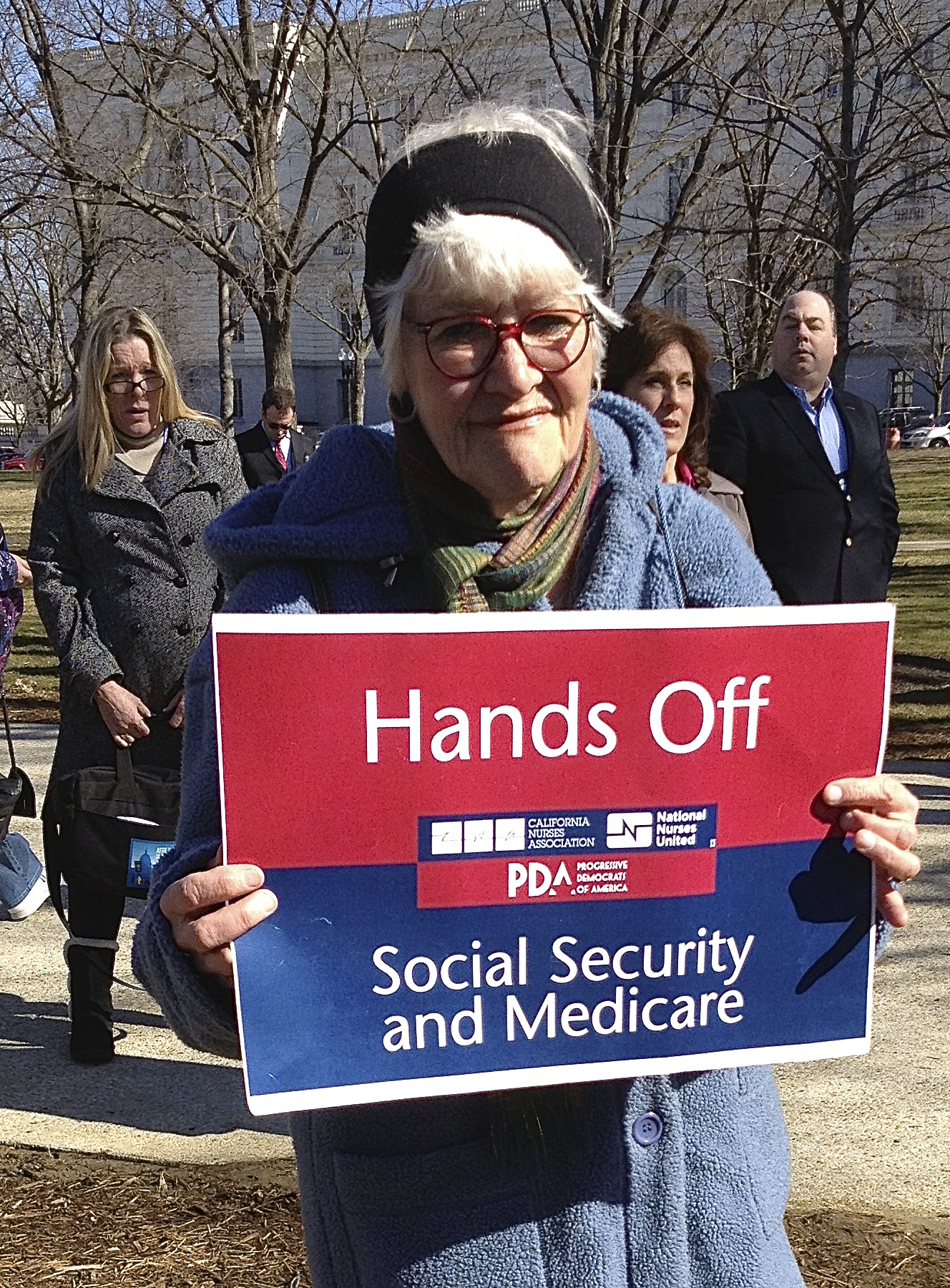
Elderly Social Security recipient with sign, "Hands off Social Security and Medicare," at a rally in Senate Park, Washington D.C., 2013

Robert L. Clark, an economist at North Carolina State University who specializes in aging issues, formerly served as a chairman of a national panel on Social Security's financial status; he has said that future options for Social Security are clear: "You either raise taxes or you cut benefits. There are lots of ways to do both."

David Koitz, a 30-year veteran of the Congressional Research Service, echoed these remarks in his 2001 book Seeking Middle Ground on Social Security Reform: "The real choices for resolving the system's problems...require current lawmakers to raise revenue or cut spending—to change the law now to explicitly raise future taxes or constrain future benefits." He discusses the 1983 Social Security amendments that followed the Greenspan Commission's recommendations. It was the commission's recommendations that provided political cover for both political parties to act. The changes approved by President Reagan in 1983 were phased in over time and included raising the retirement age from 65 to 67, taxation of benefits, cost of living adjustment (COLA) delays, and inclusion of new federal hires in the program. There was a key point during the debate when House members were forced to choose between raising the retirement age or raising future taxes; they chose the former. Senator Daniel Patrick Moynihan indicated the compromises involved showed that lawmakers could still govern. Koitz cautions against the concept of a free lunch; retirement security cannot be provided without benefit cuts or tax increases.

Economist Alice M. Rivlin summarized major reform proposals in January 2009: "Fixing Social Security is a relatively easy technical problem. It will take some combination of several much-discussed marginal changes: raising the retirement age gradually in the future (and then indexing it to longevity), raising the cap on the payroll tax, fixing the cost of living adjustment, and modifying the indexing of initial benefits so they grow more slowly for more affluent people. In view of the collapse of market values, no one is likely to argue seriously for diverting existing revenues to private accounts, so the opportunity to craft a compromise is much greater than it was a few years ago. Fixing Social Security would be a confidence building achievement for bi-partisan cooperation and would enhance our reputation for fiscal prudence."

Various institutions have analyzed different reform alternatives, including the CBO, U.S. News & World Report, the AARP, and the Urban Institute.

=== CBO studies ===
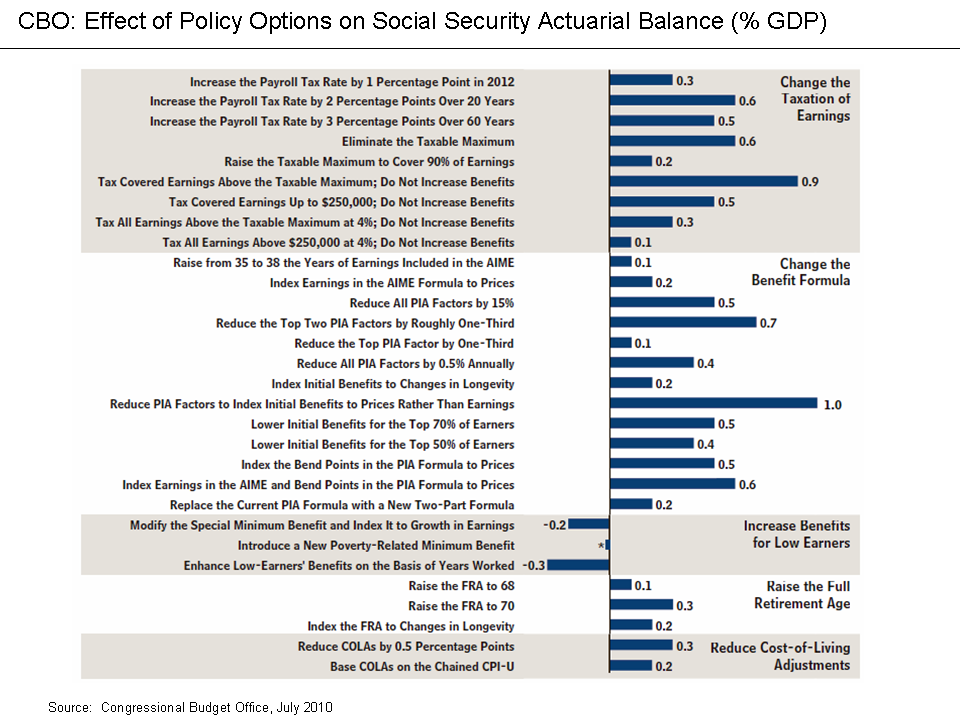
Note: CBO estimates that policy changes with a 0.6% of GDP annual impact are sufficient to address the 75-year program shortfall. Abbreviations are explained in the chart page. Source: CBO Report-July 2010.

The CBO reported in July 2010 the effects of a series of policy options on the "actuarial balance" shortfall, which over the 75 year horizon is approximately 0.6% of GDP. Social Security is facing a long-run shortfall of approximately 1% GDP per year or $155 billion/year in 2012 dollars. Key reform proposals include:

- Removing the cap on the payroll tax. Income over a threshold ($110,100 in 2012) is not subject to the payroll tax, nor are additional benefits paid to those with income above this level. Removing the cap would fund the entire 75-year shortfall.
- Raising the retirement age gradually. Raising the full-benefit retirement age to 70 would fund half the 75-year shortfall.
- Reducing cost of living adjustments (COLA), which are annual payout increases to keep pace with wages. Reducing each year's COLA by 0.5% versus the current formula would fund half the shortfall over 75 years.
- Reducing Initial Benefits for wealthier retirees, based on lifetime earnings.
- Raising the payroll tax rate. Raising the rate by one percentage point would cover half the shortfall for 75 years. Raising the rate by two percentage points gradually over 20 years would cover the entire shortfall.

One way to measure mandatory program risks is in terms of unfunded liabilities, the amount that would have to be set aside today such that principal and interest would cover program shortfalls (spending over tax revenue dedicated to the program). These are measured over a 75-year period and infinite horizon by the program's Trustees:

- The present value of unfunded obligations under Social Security was approximately $8.6 trillion over a 75-year forecast period (2012-2086). The estimated annual shortfall averages 2.5% of the payroll tax base or 0.9% of gross domestic product (a measure of the size of the economy). Measured over the infinite horizon, these figures are $20.5 trillion, 3.9% and 1.3%, respectively.

The CBO estimated in January 2012 that raising the full retirement age for Social Security from 67 to 70 would reduce outlays by about 13%. Raising the early retirement age from 62 to 64 has little impact, as those who wait longer to begin receiving benefits get a higher amount. Raising the retirement age increases the size of the workforce and the size of the economy by about 1%.

The CBO provided estimates regarding various reform alternatives in a July 2014 letter to Senator Orrin Hatch. For example, CBO wrote: "To bring the OASDI [Social Security] program as a whole into actuarial balance through 2087 with the taxable maximum set according to current law [$118,500 in 2015], the combined OASDI payroll tax rate could be permanently increased by about 3.5 percentage points...Under that option, the combined OASDI payroll tax rate would rise from 12.4 percent to 15.9 percent in 2015. Revenues credited to the Social Security trust funds in 2015 would increase by about 28 percent." This would raise taxes for a worker earning $50,000 by about $900 per year.

=== AARP study ===
The AARP publishes its views on Social Security reform options periodically. It summarized its views on a series of reform options during October 2012.

=== Urban Institute study ===
The Urban Institute estimated the effects of alternative solutions during May 2010, along with an estimated program deficit reduction:

- Reducing the cost of living adjustments (COLA) by one percentage point: 75%
- Increasing the full retirement age to 68: 30%
- Indexing the COLA to prices rather than wages, except for bottom one-third of income earners: 65%
- Raising the payroll tax cap (capped at $106,800 in 2010) to cover 90% instead of 84% of earnings: 35%
- Raising the payroll tax rate by one percentage point: 50%.

=== Fiscal Reform Commission ===
On February 18, 2010, President Obama issued an executive order mandating the creation of the bipartisan National Commission on Fiscal Responsibility and Reform, which had the goal to "[e]nsure lasting Social Security solvency, prevent the projected 22% cuts to come in 2037, reduce elderly poverty, and distribute the burden fairly". The co-chairmen of the National Commission on Fiscal Responsibility and Reform published their final report in December 2010. The co-chairmen estimated the effects of alternative solutions, along with an estimated program deficit reduction:

- Raising the payroll tax cap to cover 90% of earnings: 35%
- Indexing retirement age to life expectancy: 21%
- Adjusting the COLA formula to reflect chained CPI (e.g., reduce the COLA): 26%

In addition, the final report proposed the steps to ensure the sustainability of Social Security, such as:

- "[M]andat[ing] coverage for all state and local workers newly hired after 2020" to "simplify retirement planning and benefit coordination for workers who spend part of their career working in state and local governments, and will ensure that all workers, regardless of employer, will retire with a secure and predictable benefit check";
- Educating future retirees about "the full implications of various retirement decisions, with an eye toward encouraging delayed retirement and enhanced levels of retirement savings"; and
- Enhancing dialogue regarding the importance of personal retirement savings and responsibility, including a focus reducing personal debt and increasing personal assets.

=== President Obama's proposals ===
As of September 14, 2008, Barack Obama indicated preliminary views on Social Security reform. His website indicated that he "will work with members of Congress from both parties to strengthen Social Security and prevent privatization while protecting middle-class families from tax increases or benefit cuts. As part of a bipartisan plan that would be phased in over many years, he would ask families making over $250,000 to contribute a bit more to Social Security to keep it sound." He has opposed raising the retirement age, privatization, or cutting benefits.

== Specific proposals by topic ==
=== Reduce cost of living adjustments ===
The current system sets the initial benefit level based on the retiree's past wages. The benefit level is based on the 35 highest years of earnings. This initial amount is then subject to an annual Cost of Living Adjustment or COLA. Recent COLA were 2.3% in 2007, 5.8% in 2008, and zero for 2009–2011.

The COLA is computed based on the "Consumer Price Index for Urban Wage Earners and Clerical Workers" or CPI-W. According to the CBO: "Many analysts believe that the CPI-W overstates increases in the cost of living because it does not fully account for the fact that consumers generally adjust their spending patterns as some prices change relative to others". However, CBO also reported that: "CPI-E, an experimental version of the CPI that reflects the purchasing patterns of older people, has been 0.3 percentage points higher than the CPI-W over the past three decades". CBO estimates that reducing the COLA by 0.5% annually from its current computed amount would reduce the 75-year actuarial shortfall by 0.3% of GDP or about 50%. Reducing each year's COLA results in an annual compounding effect, with greater effect on those receiving benefits the longest.

There is disagreement about whether a reduction in the COLA constitutes a "benefit cut"; the Center for Budget and Policy Priorities considers any reduction in future promised benefits to be a "cut". However, others dispute this assertion because under any indexing strategy the actual or nominal amount of Social Security checks would never decrease but could increase at a lesser rate.

=== Raise the eligibility or retirement age ===
CBO estimated in 2010 that raising the retirement age to 70 gradually would eliminate half the 75-year funding shortfall. However, raising the retirement age disproportionally impacts lower-income workers and those who perform manual labor. The Social Security full payout retirement age in 2015 was 66 years of age; it is gradually rising to 67. However, most Americans begin taking reduced early benefits at age 62. While Americans are living longer, much of the increase in life expectancy is among those with higher incomes. The Social Security Administration estimated that retirees who made above-average incomes in their working years live six years longer than they did in the 1970s. However, retirees in the bottom half of the income distribution live only 1.3 years longer. In addition, many lower-income workers have jobs that require standing or manual labor, which becomes increasingly difficult for older workers.

=== Progressive indexing ===
Progressive indexing would lower the COLA or benefit levels for higher wage groups, with no impact or lesser impact on lower-wage groups. The Congressional Research Service reported that:

Progressive indexing[...] would index initial benefits for low earners to wage growth (as under current law), index initial benefits for high earners to price growth (resulting in lower projected benefits compared to current-law promised benefits), and index benefits for middle earners to a combination of wage growth and price growth.

President Bush endorsed a version of this approach suggested by financier Robert Pozen, which would mix price and wage indexing in setting the initial benefit level. The "progressive" feature is that the less generous price indexing would be used in greater proportion for retirees with higher incomes. The San Francisco Chronicle gave this explanation:

Under Pozen's plan, which is likely to be significantly altered even if the concept remains in legislation, all workers who earn more than about $25,000 a year would receive some benefit cuts. For example, those who retire in 50 years while earning about $36,500 a year would see their benefits reduced by 20 percent from the benefits promised under the current plan. Those who earn $90,000—the maximum income in 2005 for payroll taxes—and retire in 2055 would see their benefits cut 37 percent.

As under the current system, all retirees would have their initial benefit amount adjusted periodically for price inflation occurring after their retirement. Thus, the purchasing power of the monthly benefit level would be frozen, rather than increasing by the difference between the (typically higher) CPI-W and (typically lower) CPI-U, a broader measure of inflation.

=== Adjustments to the payroll tax limit ===
During 2015, payroll taxes were levied on the first $118,500 of income; earnings above that amount were not taxed. Approximately 6% of workers earned over this amount in 2011. Because of this limit, people with higher incomes pay a lower percentage of tax than people with lower incomes; the payroll tax is therefore a regressive tax.

CBO estimated in 2010 that removing the cap on the payroll tax (i.e., making all income subject to the flat payroll tax rate) would fully fund the program for 75 years. Removing the cap on income over $250,000 only (i.e., a "donut" in the tax code) would address about 75% of the program shortfall over 75 years.

==== 2013 Harkin bill ====
In March 2013, Senator Tom Harkin introduced S. 567: Strengthening Social Security Act of 2013. Supporters of the bill state that "By making millionaires and billionaires pay the same rate of Social Security taxes as the rest of us, and by changing the method by which Social Security benefits are calculated, Sen. Harkin's bill would expand Social Security benefits by an average of $800 per recipient per year while also keeping the program solvent" for "generations". Supporters include the Alliance for Retired Americans The letter of support by the Alliance, a nonprofit, nonpartisan organization of 4 million, states that S. 567 "recognizes the true importance of this great American program and proposes measures that would both enhance benefits for current beneficiaries and strengthen the long-term solvency of Social Security for all Americans".

=== Diamond-Orszag Plan ===
Peter A. Diamond and Peter R. Orszag proposed in their 2005 book Saving Social Security: A Balanced Approach that Social Security be stabilized by various tax and spend adjustments and gradually ending the process by which the general fund has been borrowing from payroll taxes. This requires increased revenues devoted to Social Security. Their plan, as with several other Social Security stabilization plans, relies on gradually increasing the retirement age, raising the ceiling on which people must pay FICA taxes, and slowly increasing the FICA tax rate to a peak of 15% total from the current 12.4%.

=== Expanding Social Security benefits ===
John B. Larson sponsored the Social Security 2100 Act, which would temporarily increase benefits. It would also eliminate reductions from the Social Security Government Pension Offset and Windfall Elimination Provision. It would also subject income over $400,000 to Federal Insurance Contributions Act.

== Public opinion polls ==
According to a June 2014 Pew Research Center poll:

- 67% supported no benefit reductions, with 27% supporting more benefits and 37% supporting a similar level of benefits.
- 31% supported benefit reductions, with 24% supporting fewer benefits while 6% wanted to phase out the program.

However, the poll also indicated Americans are skeptical about the future of the program: "Among the overall public, just 14% expect that Social Security will have sufficient resources to provide the current level of benefits; 39% say there will be enough money to provide reduced benefits and 43% think that, when they retire, the program will be unable to provide any benefits."

According to a December 2012 Pew Research Center poll:

- 69% supported raising the tax rate on income over $250,000.
- 51% supported reducing Social Security payments to high-income seniors.
- 42% supported gradually raising the retirement age.

A January 2015 Pew Research Center poll indicated that "Making Social Security system sound" was the fifth highest priority of 23 topics.

According to a July 2015 Gallup poll, many Americans doubted they would get Social Security benefits, although the level of doubt was similar to readings going back to 1989. Over 50% of Americans said "they doubt the system will be able to pay them a benefit when they retire." The percentage has fluctuated since its initial reading at 47% in 1989 and peaked as high as 60% in 2010. The percentage was 30% for those aged 50–64, but above 60% for those 18–49. This view runs contrary to the Social Security Trustees Reports, which indicate that since payroll taxes are dedicated to the program by law, even without reform Social Security will pay about 75% of promised benefits after the Trust Fund is exhausted in the early 2030s.

== Conceptual arguments regarding personal accounts ==
=== Cost of transition and long-term funding concerns ===
Critics argue that privatizing Social Security does nothing to address the long-term funding concerns. Diverting funds to private accounts would reduce available funds to pay current retirees, requiring significant borrowing. An analysis by the Center on Budget and Policy Priorities estimates that President Bush's 2005 privatization proposal would add $1 trillion in new federal debt in its first decade of implementation and $3.5 trillion in the decade thereafter. The 2004 Economic Report of the President found that the federal budget deficit would be more than 1 percent of gross domestic product (GDP) higher every year for roughly two decades; U.S. GDP in 2008 was $14 trillion. The debt burden for every man, woman, and child would be $32,000 higher after 32 years because of privatization.

Privatization proponents counter that the savings to the government would come through a mechanism called a "clawback", where profits from private account investment would be taxed, or a benefit reduction meaning that individuals whose accounts underperformed the market would receive less than current benefit schedules, although, even in this instance, the heirs of those who die early could receive increased benefits even if the accounts underperformed historical returns.

Opponents of privatization also point out that, even conceding for sake of argument that what they call highly optimistic numbers are true, they fail to count what the transition will cost the country as a whole. Gary Thayer, chief economist for A. G. Edwards, has been cited in the mainstream media saying that the cost of privatizing—estimated by some at $1 trillion to $2 trillion—would worsen the federal budget deficit in the short term, and "That's not something I think the credit markets would appreciate". If, as in some plans, the interest expenditure on this debt is recaptured from the private accounts before any gains are available to the workers, then the net benefit could be small or nonexistent. And this is really a key to understanding the debate, because if, on the other hand, a system which mandated investment of all assets in U.S. Treasuries resulted in a positive net recapturing, this would illustrate that the captive nature of the system results in benefits that are lower than if it merely allowed investment in U.S. Treasuries (purported to be the safest investment on Earth).

Current Social Security system advocates claim that when the risks, overhead costs and borrowing costs of any privatization plan are taken together, the result is that such a plan has a lower expected rate of return than "pay as you go" systems. They point out the high overheads of privatized plans in the United Kingdom and Chile.

=== Rate of return and individual initiative ===
Even some of those who oppose privatization agree that if current future promises to the current young generation are kept in the future, they will experience a much lower rate of return than past retirees have. Under privatization, each worker's benefit would be the combination of a minimum guaranteed benefit and the return on the private account. The proponents' argument is that projected returns (higher than those individuals currently receive from Social Security) and ownership of the private accounts would allow lower spending on the guaranteed benefit, but possibly without any net loss of income to beneficiaries.

Both wholesale and partial privatization pose questions such as: 1) How much added risk will workers bear compared to the risks they face under current system? 2) What are the potential rewards? and 3) What happens at retirement to workers whose privatized risks turn out badly? For workers, privatization would mean smaller Social Security checks, in addition to increased compensation from returns on investments, according to historical precedent. Debate has ensued over the advisability of subjecting workers' retirement money to market risks.

A technical economic argument for privatization is that, without it, the payroll taxes that support Social Security constitute a tax wedge that reduces the supply of labor, like other tax financed government welfare programs. Liberal economists like Peter Orszag and Joseph Stiglitz have argued that Social Security is already perceived as enough of a forced savings program to preclude a reduction in the labor supply. Richard Disney has agreed with this reply, noting, "To the extent that pension contributions are perceived as giving individuals rights to future pensions, the behavioral reaction of program participants to contributions will differ from their reactions to other taxes. In fact, they might regard pension contributions as providing an opportunity for retirement saving, in which case contributions should not be deducted [by economists] from household's earnings and should not be included in the tax wedge."

Privatization advocates nonetheless do not believe that social security taxes will be sufficiently regarded as pension contributions as long as they remain legally structured as taxes (as opposed to being contributions to their own private pensions).

To the extent that pension contributions are perceived as giving individuals rights to future pensions, the behavioral reaction of program participants to contributions will differ from their reactions to other taxes. In fact, they might regard pension contributions as providing an opportunity for retirement saving, in which case contributions should not be deducted from household's earnings and should not be included in the tax wedge.

Supporters of the current system maintain that its combination of low risks and low management costs, along with its social insurance provisions, work well for what the system was designed to provide: a baseline income for citizens derived from savings. From their perspective, the major deficiency of any privatization scheme is risk. Like any private investments, PRAs could fail to produce any return or could produce a lower return than proponents of privatization assert, and could even suffer a reduction in principal.

Advocates of privatization have long criticized Social Security for lower returns than the returns available from other investments, and cite numbers based on historical performance. The Heritage Foundation, a conservative think tank, calculates that a 40-year-old male with an income just under $60,000, will contribute $284,360 in payroll taxes to the Social Security Trust Fund over his working life, and can expect to receive $2,208 per month in return under the current program. They claim that the same 40-year-old male, investing the same $284,360 equally weighted into treasuries and high-grade corporate bonds over his working life, would own a PRA at retirement worth $904,982 which would pay an annuity of up to $7,372 per month (assuming that the dollar volume of such investments would not dilute yields so that they are lower than averages from a period in which no such dilution occurred.) Furthermore, they argue that the "efficiency" of the system should be measured not by costs as a percent of assets, but by returns after expenses (e.g. a 6% return reduced by 2% expenses would be preferable to a 3% return reduced by 1% expenses). Other advocates state that because privatization would increase the wealth of Social Security users, it would contribute to consumer spending, which in turn would cause economic growth.

Supporters of the current system argue that the long-term trend of U.S. securities markets cannot safely be extrapolated forward, because stock prices relative to earnings are already at very high levels by historical standards. They add that an exclusive focus on long-term trends would ignore the increased risks they think privatization would cause. The general upward trend has been punctuated by severe downturns. Critics of privatization point out that workers attempting to retire during any future such downturns, even if they prove to be temporary, will be placed at a severe disadvantage.

Proponents argue that a privatized system would open up new funds for investment in the economy, and would produce real growth. They claim that the treasuries held in the current Trust Fund are covering consumption rather than investments, and that their value rests solely upon the continued ability of the U.S. government to impose taxes. Michael Kinsley has said that there would be no net new funds for investment, because any money diverted into private accounts would produce a dollar-for-dollar increase in the federal government's borrowing from other sources to cover its general deficit.

Meanwhile, some investment-minded observers among those who do not support privatization, point out potential pitfalls to the Trust Fund's undiversified portfolio, containing only treasuries. Many of these support the government itself investing the Trust Fund into other securities, to help boost the system's overall soundness through diversification, in a plan similar to CalPERS in the state of California. Among the proponents of this idea were some members of President Bill Clinton's 1996 Social Security commission that studied the issue; the majority of the group supported partial privatization, and other members put forth the idea that Social Security funds should themselves be invested in the private markets to gain a higher rate of return.

Another criticism of privatization is that while it might theoretically relieve the government of financial responsibility, in practice for every winner from moving risk from the collective to the individual there will be a loser, and the government will be held politically responsible for preventing those losers from slipping into poverty. Proponents of the current system suspect that for the individuals whose risks turn out badly, these same individuals will support political action to raise state benefits, such that the risks such individuals may be willing to take under a privatized system are not without moral hazard.

=== Role of government ===
There are also substantive issues that do not involve economics, but rather the role of government. Conservative Nobel Prize–winning economist Gary S. Becker wrote in a February 15, 2005 article that "[privatization] reduce[s] the role of government in determining retirement ages and incomes, and improve[s] government accounting of revenues and spending obligations". He compares the privatization of Social Security to the privatization of the steel industry, citing similar "excellent reasons".

=== Management costs of private funds ===
Opponents of privatization also decry the increased management costs that any privatized system will incur. Dishonest schemes can be sold to naive buyers in which pension values are bled through fees and commissions such as happened in the UK in 1988–1993.

Since the U.S. system is passively managed—with no specific funds being tied to specific investments within individual accounts, and with the system's surpluses being automatically invested only in treasuries—its management costs are very low.

Advocates of privatization at the Cato Institute, a libertarian think tank, counter that, "Based on existing private pension plans, it appears reasonable to assume that the costs of administering a well-run system of PRAs might be anywhere from a low of roughly 15 basis points (0.15%) to a high of roughly 50 basis points (0.5%)." They also point to the low costs of index funds (funds whose value rises or falls according to a particular financial index), including an S&P 500 index fund whose management fees run between 8 basis point (0.08%) and 10 basis points (0.10%).

=== Potential windfall for Wall Street ===
Opponents also claim that privatization will bring a windfall for Wall Street brokerages and mutual fund companies, who will rake in billions of dollars in management fees.

Austan Goolsbee at the University of Chicago has written a study, "The Fees of Private Accounts and the Impact of Social Security Privatization on Financial Managers", which calculates that, "Under Plan II of the President's Commission to Strengthen Social Security (CSSS), the net present value (NPV) of such payments would be $940 billion", and, "amounts to about one-quarter (25%) of the NPV of the revenue of the entire financial sector for the next 75 years", and concludes that, "The fees would be the largest windfall gain in American financial history".

Other analysts argue that dangers of a Wall Street windfall of such magnitude are being vastly overstated. Rob Mills, vice-president of the brokerage industry trade group Securities Industry Association, calculated in a report published in December 2004 that the proposed private accounts might generate $39 billion in fees, in NPV terms, over the next 75 years. This amount would represent only 1.2% of the sector's projected NPV revenues of $3.3 trillion over that timeframe. He concludes that privatization is "hardly likely to be a bonanza for Wall Street".

== Other reform proposals ==
A range of other proposals have been suggested for partial choice, such as the 7.65% Solution. One, suggested by a number of Republican candidates during the 2000 elections, would set aside an initially small but increasing percentage of each worker's payroll tax into a fund, which the worker would be allowed to invest in securities. Another eliminated the Social Security payroll tax completely for workers born after a certain date, and allowed workers of different ages different periods of time during which they could opt to not pay the payroll tax, in exchange for a proportional delay in their receipt of payouts.

Most state pension plans invest a portion of employer and employee contributions in a mixture of stocks, bonds, real estate, etc., which they or professional fund managers invest on behalf of the employees, without creating individual investment accounts.

== George W. Bush's personal accounts proposal ==
President George W. Bush discussed the "partial privatization" of Social Security since the beginning of his presidency in 2001. But only after winning re-election in 2004 did he begin to invest his political capital in pursuing changes in earnest.

In May 2001, he announced establishment of a 16-member bipartisan commission "to study and report specific recommendations to preserve Social Security for seniors while building wealth for younger Americans", with the specific directive that it consider only how to incorporate individually controlled, voluntary personal retirement accounts . The majority of members serving on Bill Clinton's similar Social Security commission in 1996 had recommended through their own report that partial privatization be implemented. Bush's Commission to Strengthen Social Security (CSSS) issued a report in December 2001 (revised in March 2002), which proposed three alternative plans for partial privatization:

- Plan I: Up to two percent of taxable wages could be diverted from FICA and voluntarily placed by workers into private accounts for investment in stocks, bonds, and/or mutual funds.
- Plan II: Up to four percent of taxable wages, up to a maximum of $1,000, could be diverted from FICA and voluntarily placed by workers into private accounts for investment.
- Plan III: One percent of wages on top of FICA, and 2.5% diverted from FICA up to a maximum of $1000, could be voluntarily placed by workers into private accounts for investment.

On February 2, 2005, Bush made Social Security a prominent theme of his State of the Union Address. In this speech, which sparked the debate, it was Plan II of CSSS's report that Bush outlined as the starting point for changes in Social Security. He outlined, in general terms, a proposal based on partial privatization. After a phase-in period, workers currently less than 55 years old would have the option to set aside four percentage points of their payroll taxes in individual accounts that could be invested in the private sector, in "a conservative mix of bonds and stock funds". Workers making such a choice might receive larger or smaller benefits than if they had not done so, depending on the performance of the investments they selected.

Although Bush described the Social Security system as "headed for bankruptcy", his proposal would not affect the projected shortfall in Social Security tax receipts. Reform would mean that some workers would pay less into the system's general fund and receive less back from it. Administration officials said that the proposal would have a "net neutral effect" on the system's financial situation, and that Bush would discuss with Congress how to fill the projected shortfall. The Congressional Budget Office had previously analyzed the commission's "Plan II" (the plan most similar to Bush's proposal) and had concluded that the individual accounts would have little or no overall effect on the system's solvency, and that virtually all the savings would come instead from changing the benefits formula.

As illustrated by the CBO analysis, one possible approach to the shortfall would be benefit cuts that would affect all retirees, not just those choosing the private accounts. Bush alluded to this option, mentioning some suggestions that he linked to various former Democratic officeholders. He did not endorse any specific benefit cuts himself, however. He said only, "All these ideas are on the table." He expressed his opposition to any increase in Social Security taxes. Later that month, his press secretary, Scott McClellan, ambiguously characterized raising or eliminating the cap on income subject to the tax as a tax increase that Bush would oppose.

In his speech, Bush did not address the issue of how the system would continue to provide benefits for current and near-future retirees if some of the incoming Social Security tax receipts were to be diverted into private accounts. A few days later, however, Vice-President Dick Cheney stated that the plan would require borrowing $758 billion over the period 2005 to 2014; that estimate has been criticized as being unrealistically low.

On April 28, 2005, Bush held a televised press conference at which he provided additional detail about the proposal he favored. For the first time, he endorsed reducing the benefits that some retirees would receive. He endorsed a plan from Robert Pozen, described below in the section regarding suggestions for Social Security that do not involve privatization.

Although Bush's State of the Union speech left many important aspects of his proposal unspecified, debate began on the basis of the broad outline he had given.

=== Politics of the dispute over Bush's proposal ===
The issue gained increasing political scrutiny since George W. Bush mentioned changing Social Security during the 2004 elections, and since he made it clear in his nationally televised January 2005 speech that he intended to work to partially privatize the system during his second term.

To assist the effort, Republican donors were asked after the election to help raise $50 million or more for a campaign in support of the proposal, with contributions expected from such sources as the fiscally conservative 501(c)4 organization Club for Growth and the securities industry. In 1983, a Cato Institute paper had noted that privatization would require "mobilizing the various coalitions that stand to benefit from the change...the business community, and financial institutions in particular". Soon after Bush's State of the Union speech, the Club for Growth began running television advertisements in the districts of Republican members of Congress whom it identified as undecided on the issue.

A group backed by labor unions called "Americans United to Protect Social Security" "set its sights on killing Bush's privatization plan and silencing his warnings that Social Security was 'headed toward bankruptcy.'"

On January 16, 2005, The New York Times reported internal Social Security Administration documents directing employees to disseminate the message that "Social Security's long-term financing problems are serious and need to be addressed soon", and to "insert solvency messages in all Social Security publications".

Coming soon after the disclosure of government payments to commentator Armstrong Williams to promote the No Child Left Behind Act, the revelation prompted the objection from Dana C. Duggins, a vice president of the Social Security Council of the American Federation of Government Employees, that "Trust fund dollars should not be used to promote a political agenda."

In the weeks following his State of the Union speech, Bush devoted considerable time and energy to campaigning for privatization. He held "town meetings" at many locations around the country. Attendance at these meetings was controlled to ensure that the crowds would be supportive of Bush's plan. In Denver, for example, three people who had obtained tickets through Representative Bob Beauprez, a Republican, were nevertheless ejected from the meeting before Bush appeared, because they had arrived at the event in a car with a bumper sticker reading "No More Blood for Oil".

Opponents of Bush's plan have analogized his dire predictions about Social Security to similar statements that he made to muster support for the 2003 Invasion of Iraq.

A dispute between the AARP and a conservative group for older Americans, USA Next, cropped up around the time of the State of the Union speech. The AARP had supported Bush's plan for major changes in Medicare in 2003, but it opposed his Social Security privatization initiative. In January 2005, before the State of the Union Address, the AARP ran advertisements attacking the idea. In response, USA Next launched a campaign against AARP. Charlie Jarvis of USA Next stated: "They [AARP] are the boulder in the middle of the highway to personal savings accounts. We will be the dynamite that removes them."

The tone of the debate between these two interest groups is merely one example among many of the tone of many of the debates, discussions, columns, advertisements, articles, letters, and white papers that Bush's proposal, to touch the "third rail", has sparked among politicians, pundits, thinktankers, and taxpayers.

Immediately after Bush's State of the Union speech, a national poll brought some good news for each side of the controversy. Only 17% of the respondents thought the Social Security system was "in a state of crisis", but 55% thought it had "major problems". The general idea of allowing private investments was favored by 40% and opposed by 55%. Specific proposals that received more support than opposition (in each case by about a two-to-one ratio) were "Limiting benefits for wealthy retirees" and "Requiring higher income workers to pay Social Security taxes on ALL of their wages". The poll was conducted by USA Today, CNN, and the Gallup Organization.

Bush's April press conference detailed the proposal further, with Bush describing his preference in "a reform system should protect those who depend on Social Security the most" and describing his proposal as "a Social Security system in the future where benefits for low-income workers will grow faster than benefits for people who are better off." Opponents countered that middle-class retirees would experience cuts, and that those below the poverty line would receive only what they are entitled to under current law. Democrats also expressed concern that a Social Security system that primarily benefited the poor would have less widespread political support. Finally, the issue of private accounts continued to be a divisive one. Many legislators remained opposed or dubious, while Bush, in his press conference, said he felt strongly about the point.

Despite Bush's emphasis on the issue, many Republicans in Congress were not enthusiastic about his proposal, and Democrats were unanimously opposed. In late May 2005, House Majority Whip Roy Blunt listed the "priority legislation" to be acted on after Memorial Day; Social Security was not included, and Bush's proposal was considered by many to be dead. In September, some Congressional Republicans pointed to the budgetary problems caused by Hurricane Katrina as a further obstacle to acting on the Bush proposal. Congress did not enact any major changes to Social Security in 2005, or before its pre-election adjournment in 2006.

During the campaigning for the 2006 midterm election, Bush stated that reviving his proposal for privatizing Social Security would be one of his top two priorities for his last two years in office. In 2007, he continued to pursue that goal by nominating Andrew Biggs, a privatization advocate and former researcher for the Cato Institute, to be deputy commissioner of the Social Security Administration. When the Senate did not confirm Biggs, Bush made a recess appointment, enabling Biggs to hold the post without Senate confirmation until December 2008. During his last days in office, Bush said that spurring the debate on Social Security was his most effective achievement during his presidency.

== Other concerns ==
Some alleged that George W. Bush was opposed to Social Security on ideological grounds, regarding it as a form of governmental redistribution of income, which other groups such as libertarians strongly oppose. Some of the critics of Bush's plan argued that its real purpose was not to save the current Social Security system, but to lay the groundwork for dismantling it. They note that, in 2000, when Bush was asked about a possible transition to a fully privatized system, he replied: "It's going to take a while to transition to a system where personal savings accounts are the predominant part of the investment vehicle...This is a step toward a completely different world, and an important step." His comment is consonant with the Cato Institute's reference in 1983 to a "Leninist strategy" for "guerrilla warfare" against both the current Social Security system and the coalition that supports it."

Critics of the system, such as Nobel Laureate economist Milton Friedman, have said that Social Security redistributes wealth from the poor to the wealthy. Workers must pay 12.4%, including a 6.2% employer contribution, on their wages below the Social Security Wage Base ($102,000 in 2008), but no tax on income in excess of this amount. Therefore, high earners pay a lower percentage of their total income, resulting in a regressive tax. The benefit paid to each worker is also calculated using the wage base on which the tax was paid. Changing the system to tax all earnings without increasing the benefit wage base would result in the system being a progressive tax. Reason magazine has said that Social Security should be abolished altogether stating:

Social Security is not a retirement fund—it's a transfer program, taking income from the payrolls of current workers and giving it to retirees. Generally, these retirees are already wealthier than the workers subsidizing them. Social Security's retirement payments (Old-Age and Survivors Insurance) should be phased out because of the program's unsustainable and regressive nature, freeing workers to better use their earnings to plan for their own retirement.

Furthermore, wealthier individuals generally have higher life expectancies and thus may expect to receive larger benefits for a longer period than poorer taxpayers, often minorities. A single individual who dies before age 62, who is more likely to be poor, receives no retirement benefits despite years of paying Social Security tax. On the other hand, individuals who live to age 100, and more likely to be wealthy, are guaranteed payments that are more than they paid into the system.

A factor working against wealthier individuals and in favor of the poor with little other retirement income is that Social Security benefits become subject to federal income tax based on income. The portion varies with income level, 50% at $32,000 rising to 85% at $44,000 for married couples in 2008. This does not just affect those that continue to work after retirement. Unearned income withdrawn from tax deferred retirement accounts, like IRAs and 401(k)s, counts towards taxation of benefits.

Critics claimed that Social Security's rate of return is lower than private capital markets.

=== Effects of the gift to the first generation ===
It has been argued that the first generation of social security participants have, in effect, received a large gift, because they received far more benefits than they paid into the system. The term associated with this historical imbalance has been coined "legacy debt". Robert J. Shiller noted that "the initial designers of the Social Security System in 1935 had envisioned the building of a large trust fund", but "the 1939 amendments and subsequent changes prevented this from happening".

As such, the gift to the first generation is necessarily borne by subsequent generations. In this pay-as-you-go system, current workers are paying the benefits of the previous generation, instead of investing for their own retirement, and therefore, attempts at privatizing Social Security could result in workers having to pay twice: once to fund the benefits of current retirees, and a second time to fund their own retirement.

=== Pyramid- or Ponzi-scheme similarities ===
Critics have asserted that the funding mechanism of Social Security's pay-as-you-go funding mechanism has similarities with an illegal Ponzi scheme, where early investors are paid off out of the funds collected from later investors instead of from profits from business activity. In particular, they describe a sustainability problem that they say happens when the number of new contributors declines.

William G. Shipman of the Cato Institute argues:

In common usage a trust fund is an estate of money and securities held in trust for its beneficiaries. The Social Security Trust Fund is quite different. It is an accounting of the difference between tax and benefit flows. When taxes exceed benefits, the federal government lends itself the excess in return for an interest-paying bond, an IOU that it issues to itself. The government then spends its new funds on unrelated projects such as bridge repairs, defense, or food stamps. The funds are not invested for the benefit of present or future retirees.

This criticism is not new. In his 1936 presidential campaign, Republican Alf Landon called the trust fund "a cruel hoax". The Republican's party platform that year stated, "The so-called reserve fund estimated at forty-seven billion dollars for old age insurance is no reserve at all, because the fund will contain nothing but the Government's promise to pay, while the taxes collected in the guise of premiums will be wasted by the Government in reckless and extravagant political schemes."

As of 2009, the Social Security Administration responded to the criticism as follows:

There is a superficial analogy between pyramid or Ponzi schemes and pay-as-you-go insurance programs in that in both money from later participants goes to pay the benefits of earlier participants. But that is where the similarity ends. A pay-as-you-go system can be visualized as a simple pipeline, with money from current contributors coming in the front end and money to current beneficiaries paid out the back end. As long as the amount of money coming in the front end of the pipe maintains a rough balance with the money paid out, the system can continue forever. There is no unsustainable progression driving the mechanism of a pay-as-you-go pension system, and so it is not a pyramid or Ponzi scheme. If the demographics of the population were stable, then a pay-as-you-go system would not have demographically-driven financing ups and downs, and no thoughtful person would be tempted to compare it to a Ponzi arrangement. However, since population demographics tend to rise and fall, the balance in pay-as-you-go systems tends to rise and fall as well. This vulnerability to demographic ups and downs is one of the problems with pay-as-you-go financing. But this problem has nothing to do with Ponzi schemes or any other fraudulent form of financing; it is simply the nature of pay-as-you-go systems.

In March 2025, Elon Musk called social security a Ponzi scheme.

== See also ==
- Generational accounting
- List of Social Security legislation (United States)
- Pensions crisis
- Social Security (United States) for both information about the program, as it currently exists, and historical information about the creation of the program in the mid-1930s and the controversies at that time.
- Welfare's effect on poverty
- Isidore Sydney Falk
