= NARFE =

Political advocacy group in the United States

The National Active and Retired Federal Employees Association (NARFE) is a US-based nonprofit, 501(c)5 membership association dedicated to preserving, protecting, and improving the pay and benefits of active and retired federal employees, their families, and survivors.

== History ==
The Civil Service system, created by the Pendleton Civil Service Reform Act (1883), shifted public service from a spoils system/patronage system to a merit system based on competitive exams and protection against retaliatory firing or demotion but did not provide for any tangible benefits for the new civil service employees. It was not until 1920, that the Civil Service Retirement System (CSRS), that federal civilian employees were granted retirement, disability, and survivor benefits.

In 1921, 14 retired federal government workers met to form an association to protect the hard-earned retirement benefits of federal civilian employees, retirees, and their survivors in the organization that would become NARFE, but not for everyone. In the first two months after the Civil Service Retirement Act took effect in 1921, more than 5,000 workers retired, some of whom were more than 90 years old. Thanks in large part to the work of NARFE’s founders, a 1926 law raised the amount of the annuities retirees received but also increased the amount deducted from the wages of current employees, from 2.5 percent to 3.5 percent of their salaries. In 1930, the government began to compute annuities in a way proportional to the amounts deducted from employees' wages and reduced the period of service required to receive an annuity from 15 to five years. NARFE was born.

For a more detailed history of NARFE's first 100 years, refer to 100 Years of NARFE: A Look Back at the Civil Service at the Organization’s Inception, in 2021.

== Organization ==
The NARFE National office is located in Alexandria, Virginia. NARFE is governed by the 12-member National Executive Board (NEB) which includes the National President, National Secretary-Treasurer, and ten regional vice presidents (RVPs) who communicate their regions' concerns to the NEB and NEB decisions back to their state federations. Each region is composed of four to eight states (or territories) federations for a total of 54 state federations. Each state federation includes both NARFE National-only members (NOM) and chapter members, and is governed by a slate of elected officers (federation president, vice-president, secretary, and treasurer) according to each state's federation bylaws.

== Membership and goals ==
NARFE has some 175,000 members and over 800 NARFE chapters in almost every state within the United States, as well as chapters in Washington, D.C., Puerto Rico, Panama and the Philippines. Most members of NARFE are covered under either the Civil Service Retirement System (CSRS, including CSRS Offset) or the Federal Employees Retirement System (FERS) (including FERS Revised Annuity Employees (FERS-RAE), FERS Further Revised Annuity Employees (FERS-FRAE)) or are spouses or surviving spouses of Federal employees.

118th Congress (2023-24) advocacy issues include:

- "The Equal COLAs Act, H.R. 866/S. 3194 which aims to rectify the unjust policy that caps the cost of living adjustments (COLA) for those under the Federal Employees Retirement System (FERS), ensuring that the value of their retirement security is preserved;"
- "The Saving the Civil Service Act, H.R. 1002/S. 399 which would prevent the return of Schedule F, a statutory loophole that would have bypassed the system of rules ensuring federal employees are hired and fired based on competence rather than political connections, and that competitive service protections cannot be stripped away by reclassifying a position into the excepted service; and
- "Pushing to bringing the Social Security Fairness Act, H.R. 82 to a floor vote which aims repeal Social Security Government Pension Offset (GPO) and Windfall Elimination Provision (WEP)" which aims to repeal these measures that have unfairly diminished retirement benefits of hardworking public servants.

Through both of these acts, NARFE is trying to increase the pensions of retired federal workers.

== NARFE legislative program ==
The legislative program of NARFE is made annually coming before each Congress. The program is divided into three categories to show their importance as NARFE legislative goals. The first is to preserve the goals already reached. The second is to provide benefits to the future members of NARFE. The third includes all other goals of NARFE.

== Political contributions ==
According to OpenSecrets, in 2018 NARFE donated $850,750 to political candidates, of which 78% went to Democratic candidates and 21% to Republican candidates.
