= Retirement Insurance Benefits =

U.S. old age insurance

Old-Age, Survivors, and Disability Insurance (OASDI)
- Social Security Retirement Benefits

Program Overview
- Country: United States
- Agency: Social Security Administration (SSA)
- Type: Social Insurance
- Established: August 14, 1935
- Status: Active

Eligibility & Structure
- Early retirement age: 62
- Full retirement age: 66 to 67 (depending on birth year)
- Minimum work: 40 credits (10 years of work)
- Funding source: Payroll taxes (FICA / SECA)

Benefit Details
- Calculation basis: Highest 35 years of indexed earnings
- Max monthly payout: $4,873/mo (at FRA in 2024)
- Taxability: Partially taxable (based on combined income)
- COLA adjustments: Annual (based on CPI-W)

Legal & External Links
- Governing law: Social Security Act of 1935
- Official website: ssa.gov

Retirement Insurance Benefits (abbreviated RIB) or old-age insurance benefits are a form of social insurance payments made by the U.S. Social Security Administration paid based upon the attainment of old age (62 or older). Benefit payments are made on the 3rd of the month, or the 2nd, 3rd, or 4th Wednesday of the month, based upon the date of birth and entitlement to other benefits.

== Legal authority ==
RIB is authorized under Title II of the Social Security Act.

== Entitlement factors ==
Certain requirements must be met before a person becomes entitled to RIB. These requirements are based on both age and payments made into the Social Security System through payroll taxes. These are:

- Be fully insured under the Social Security system
- Have obtained the age of 62 by the first of the month.
- Have either applied for the benefits or have been automatically converted from Disability Insurance Benefits at Full Retirement Age.

=== Fully insured status ===
People attain fully insured status based upon their payments into the Social Security system through payroll taxes and the amount of time they have been working in jobs covered through the Social Security system. This is measured through quarters of coverage.

A person earns one quarter of coverage for each $1,410 of earned income in 2020. A person can earn up to four quarters of coverage per year. The amount to earn one quarter of coverage may change from year to year based on the national average wage index. (Note: For years before 1978, a person received one quarter of coverage for each three-month period during which the person received at least $50 of wages. A self-employed person received four quarters of coverage for each year during which the person received at least $400 of self-employment income. Beginning in 1978, employers were required to report annual wages, rather than quarterly wages. As a result, the rules was changed, so that a person received one quarter of coverage for each $250 of wages or self-employment income earned by a person, up to a maximum of four quarters of coverage per year. For each year after 1978, the quarter of coverage amount is equal to the ratio of the national average wage index for the current to that of 1976, multiplied by the 1978 amount of $250. Amounts are rounded down to the nearest multiple of $10. The quarter of coverage amount for a particular year cannot be less than that of the previous year.)

In order to be considered fully insured, a person must generally have at least 40 quarters of coverage. (Note: A person with at least 40 quarters of coverage is automatically considered fully insured. Alternatively, a person is considered fully insured if they have at least six quarters of coverage, and the person has at least one quarter of coverage for each calendar year after the later of 1950 or the year they attain the age of 21, and the earlier of the year in which they attain the age of 62 or the year of death.) Fully insured status is used for other benefits besides RIB.

=== Age 62 ===
The United States uses English common law; because of this a person obtains their age on the day before their birthday. A person born on the first of the month is considered to obtain their age in the month prior and a person born on January 1 is considered to obtain their age in the prior year. In order for a person to be eligible for RIB in the month of their birth, they must have either been born on the first (where they obtained their age in the prior month) or the second of the month (where they obtained their age on the first of the month).

=== Application ===
Benefit payments vary, in part, based on when a person claims RIB, so not every person will desire to begin collecting their benefits at the same time. As a result, an application must be filed with the Social Security Administration before one can collect RIB. There are several ways to apply for the benefits:

- Calling SSA's national toll-free number (1-800-772-1213) or
- Contacting a local Social Security office or
- Submitting an online application

== Benefit amount ==
The amount of a RIB payment is based upon several factors, including: social security payroll taxes paid into the Social Security Trust Fund, the age at which benefits are claimed, the current earned income of an individual, and military service.

=== Primary insurance amount (PIA) ===
The primary factor in deciding the amount of a RIB payment is the PIA which may be computed in different ways; the highest PIA is used on a person's record. Where a new start method and an old start method come up with the same PIA, it is considered that the new start method is used.

=== Benefits reduced for age ===
RIB benefits can be claimed in any month after the age of 62, subject to certain restrictions. However, benefits may be reduced if they are claimed before that person's Full Retirement Age. For each month that the benefit is claimed before the month in which the person attains Full Retirement Age, the benefit is reduced by a certain amount of the PIA. For the first 36 months, the benefit is reduced by 5/9 of 1% of the PIA; for additional months it is reduced by 5/12 of 1%. The aggregate reduction for the first three years is 20%.

For the formulae, RF means Reduction Factor, the number of months RIB is claimed early

Formula for First 36 Months: Benefit = PIA × (180 – RF) /180

Formula for Additional Months: Benefit = PIA × (228 – RF) /240

For example, for an individual whose Full Retirement Age is 66 and 10 months and who has a PIA of $1,000, the benefit, if claimed at 62, would be $708.

=== Delayed retirement credits (DRCs) ===
DRCs are accrued in any month between the month in which a person attains Full Retirement Age and the month they attain the age of 70 and they postpone claiming RIB. A person who is already claiming RIB may also voluntarily decide to stop receiving their payments temporarily to accrue DRCs beginning at their Full Retirement Age.

The value of DRCs is 2/3% a month or 8 percent per year for postponement of claiming RIB. For example, if the person's full retirement age is 66 and 10 months and the PIA is $1,000, the benefit if claimed at 66 and 10 months would be $1,000 but would be $1,253 (plus any cost of living adjustment) if claimed at age 70.

=== Earnings tests ===
An earnings test has been part of the calculation of retirement benefits since the Social Security Act was signed in 1935. There are two earnings tests applied to beneficiaries who are under Full Retirement Age, the Annual Earnings Test (AET) and Monthly Earnings Test (MET). The Senior Citizen's Freedom to Work Act of 2000, signed into law April 7, 2000, eliminated the use of these tests for beneficiaries who have attained their Full Retirement Age.

==== Annual earnings test ====
The AET is used as the primary earnings test for RIB. The test applies only to earned income and has a two tier system in calculating deductions. The first tier, for those who are not reaching Full Retirement Age in the current year, reduces the benefits for the year by $1 for every full $2 the beneficiary earns over the annual exempt amount. The second tier, for those who are reaching their full retirement age, reduces the benefits for the year by $1 for every full $3 the beneficiary earns over the second tier annual exempt amount. The first tier annual exempt amount is $18,960 and the second tier annual exempt amount is $50,520 for the year 2021. When possible, all benefits deducted are deducted at the beginning of the year before any benefits are paid.

The earnings test does not reduce lifetime Social Security benefits, on average. This is because any benefits lost to the earnings test lead to increased monthly benefit amounts when an individual reaches the full retirement age. For example, if an individual claims benefits at 62 in 2021 and receives $920 a month, but then returns to work for a year and has 12 months of benefits withheld, SSA would recompute the benefit at the person's full retirement age and pay $985 a month (in today's dollars) going forward. Thus, the earnings test shifts Social Security benefits from a time when a person is working to a time when they are more likely to be retired.

==== Monthly earnings test ====
The MET can be used only in certain years, under certain conditions. In order for the MET to be applied to any given year, that year must first be considered a grace year, which requires that it either be the first year in which the beneficiary is entitled to benefits under Title II of the Social Security Act, during a year in which there was at least one month in which the beneficiary was not entitled to Title II benefits, or a year in which the beneficiaries entitlement to Title II benefits was terminated for reasons other than death. The grace year must also include at least one non-service month, which is any month in which the beneficiary neither earns wages over the monthly exempt amount nor performs substantial services in self-employment. Services are considered substantial in self-employment if they consist of over 45 hours in a single month or 15 hours if it is a "highly skilled occupation."

The monthly exempt amount is 1/12 of the yearly exempt amount for that year. For first tier beneficiaries, the monthly exempt amount is $1,130 and $3,010 for second tier beneficiaries for 2008.

The MET is helpful for beneficiaries who retire in the middle of the year and who would be penalized for earlier earnings under the AET.

=== Windfall elimination provision (WEP) ===
The Social Security Amendments of 1983 (Public Law 98-21) created the Windfall Elimination Provision (abbreviated WEP) which was a statutory provision in United States law which affected benefits paid by the Social Security Administration under Title II of the Social Security Act. It reduced the Primary Insurance Amount (PIA) of a person's Retirement Insurance Benefits (RIB) or Disability Insurance Benefits (DIB) when that person was eligible or entitled to a pension based on a job which did not contribute to the Social Security Trust Fund. When it was in effect, it also affected the benefits of others claiming on the same social security record. It was repealed by the Social Security Fairness Act (H.R. 82) in 2025.

Beneficiaries who had been employed in work that did not pay into the Social Security Trust Fund and who received a pension from that employment based upon earnings which were not covered by Social Security may have seen their benefits partially offset by the WEP. The WEP applied once the beneficiary was both entitled to RIB and was entitled to the pension or met all the requirements except for stopping work or filing an application.

There was a possibility that with enough years of coverage (YOC) that the WEP may have been either reduced or waived. Anyone with 30 or more YOCs was exempt from the WEP. Beneficiaries with between 21 and 29 YOCs had the effect of the WEP reduced.

The WEP may have reduced the benefit in various ways, taking various rules and computation methods into account (see main article). The WEP was developed as the result of the progressive method in which the PIA is computed. Because those with less earnings on the record receive a comparatively larger percentage of their average income, under normal computations a beneficiary who paid in little to the Social Security system and who was drawing a separate pension may have had what was perceived as an unfair advantage in their benefits.

== Full retirement age ==
Originally, all RIB beneficiaries reached their Full Retirement Age at the age of 65. Changes in the Full Retirement Age have been enacted, based upon the birthdate of the beneficiary as follows:

- Prior to January 2, 1938: 65 years
- January 2, 1938 – January 1, 1939: 65 years and 2 months
- January 2, 1939 – January 1, 1940: 65 years and 4 months
- January 2, 1940 – January 1, 1941: 65 years and 6 months
- January 2, 1941 – January 1, 1942: 65 years and 8 months
- January 2, 1942 – January 1, 1943: 65 years and 10 months
- January 2, 1943 – January 1, 1955: 66 years
- January 2, 1955 – January 1, 1956: 66 years and 2 months
- January 2, 1956 – January 1, 1957: 66 years and 4 months
- January 2, 1957 – January 1, 1958: 66 years and 6 months
- January 2, 1958 – January 1, 1959: 66 years and 8 months
- January 2, 1959 – January 1, 1960: 66 years and 10 months
- After January 1, 1960: 67 years

== Time of payment ==
RIB payments, like all benefits paid under Title II of the Social Security Act, are generally paid on one of the following days depending on the beneficiary's payment cycle:

- Cycle 1: 3rd day of the month
- Cycle 2: 2nd Wednesday of the month
- Cycle 3: 3rd Wednesday of the month
- Cycle 4: 4th Wednesday of the month

For Cycle 1 beneficiaries, payment is moved to the preceding Friday if the 3rd day of the month falls on Saturday or Sunday. Similarly, if a payment date falls on a federal holiday—which can only happen for Cycle 2 beneficiaries on Veterans Day and Cycle 4 beneficiaries on Christmas—payment is moved to the preceding day.

Cycling the benefits onto four different payment days began in 1997 as the result of unequal workloads in the beginning of the month which made it difficult for all beneficiaries to have easy access to the Administration. At this time, over 50 million checks were issued by the Administration within the first three days of the month with an expectation that the workload would be over 70 million within the first three days by 2020 with the baby boomers retired.

Beneficiaries who are already receiving benefits on the 3rd of the month continue receiving them on that date, unless they volunteer for cycling. New beneficiaries who were born between the 1st and 10th of the month are in Payment Cycle 2; those born between the 11th and 20th are in Payment Cycle 3; and those born later in the month are in Payment Cycle 4. However, certain individuals will still be placed into Payment Cycle 1:

- Beneficiaries who receive Supplemental Security Income (SSI)
- Beneficiaries whose income is deemed, in part, to an SSI recipient
- Beneficiaries for whom the State pays their Medicare premiums through the Qualified Medicare Beneficiaries program
- Beneficiaries who become entitled on a new record and who were receiving benefits on the 3rd of the month on another record, without a break in entitlement
- Beneficiaries who receive any payments from the Railroad Retirement Board, and
- Beneficiaries whose checks are garnished by court-ordered child support, alimony, or tax levy

Title II payments a beneficiary is entitled to for any given month will be paid in the following month. (ex. if a beneficiary is entitled to a payment in August, they will receive that payment in September)

== Termination of benefits ==
The last month of entitlement to RIB is the month before the month in which the beneficiary dies.

== See also ==
- Disability Insurance Benefits
- Social Security Administration
- Social Security (United States)
- Supplemental Security Income

== Sources ==
- Social Security Online. Social Security Administration. www.ssa.gov.
- Social Security Program Operations Manual System. Social Security Administration. https://web.archive.org/web/20070610231614/https://s044a90.ssa.gov/apps10/poms.nsf/partlist!OpenView.
