= Social Security Government Pension Offset =

Statutory provision in United States law

The Government Pension Offset (GPO) was a statutory provision in United States law which affected benefits paid by the Social Security Administration. It was repealed by the Social Security Fairness Act of 2023 (H.R. 82), which President Biden signed on January 5, 2025. It reduced spousal and widow(er) Social Security retirement benefits in situations where the spouse did not pay Social Security taxes on their employment earnings.

Many state and local government employees and other non-covered pension recipients do not contribute to the Social Security system. One exception to this provision occurred when the spouse was receiving a foreign pension for a different country, in which case the Government Pension Offset was not applied (unlike the Windfall Elimination Provision, which also applied to foreign pensions and benefits that the number holder received). This was in contrast to the Windfall Elimination Provision (WEP), which reduced Social Security benefits of the actual number holder on whose Social Security record the claim was filed.

== Effects on benefits ==
Social security benefits were reduced by two-thirds of the non-covered government pension amount. Note this was not two-thirds of the Social Security benefit; for example, a $600 non-covered pension benefit would have reduced Social Security spousal benefits by $400, regardless of whether the spouse was entitled to $500 or $1000 on the Social Security record of the number holder.

== See also ==
- Retirement Insurance Benefits
- Disability Insurance Benefits
- Windfall Elimination Provision
