= Social Security Fairness Act =

United States law regarding Social Security

- Long title: To amend title II of the Social Security Act to repeal the Government pension offset and windfall elimination provisions.
- Announced in: the 118th United States Congress
- Number of co-sponsors: 323

Citations
- Public law: Pub. L. 118–273 (text) (PDF)

Codification
- Acts amended: Social Security Act
- Titles amended: 42 U.S.C.: Public Health and Social Welfare
- U.S.C. sections amended: 42 U.S.C. ch. 7, subch. II § 402 et seq. 42 U.S.C. ch. 7, subch. II § 415 et seq.

Legislative history
- Introduced in the House as H.R. 82 by Garret Graves (R–LA) on January 9, 2023; Committee consideration by House Ways and Means Committee; Passed the House on November 12, 2024 (327–75); Passed the Senate on December 21, 2024 (76-20); Signed into law by President Joe Biden on January 5, 2025

The Social Security Fairness Act is a United States law that repealed the Social Security Government Pension Offset and Windfall Elimination Provision. The bill passed the House in November 2024 and then passed the Senate in December. It was signed into law by President Joe Biden on January 5, 2025.

== Background ==
In the United States, Social Security offers government-sponsored Retirement Insurance Benefits to retired individuals that have reached 40 quarters of work, following the Average Indexed Monthly Earnings formula; this is generally applicable to all workers, but there are some exceptions.

Over fears that the system would run out of money in 1983, however, Congress passed the Social Security Amendments of 1983, which created the Windfall Elimination Provision, which reduced the benefit formula for those with a non-covered pension as well as qualified for social security benefits. Those with uncovered pensions include some government employees, railroad workers, non-profit workers, and teachers, among others.

== Provisions ==
SECTION 1. Short title.

This Act may be cited as the “Social Security Fairness Act of 2023”.

SEC. 2. Repeal of government pension offset provision.

(a) In general.—Section 202(k) of the Social Security Act (42 U.S.C. 402(k)) is amended by striking paragraph (5).

(b) Conforming amendments.—

(1) Section 202(b)(2) of the Social Security Act (42 U.S.C. 402(b)(2)) is amended by striking “subsections (k)(5) and (q)” and inserting “subsection (q)”.

(2) Section 202(c)(2) of such Act (42 U.S.C. 402(c)(2)) is amended by striking “subsections (k)(5) and (q)” and inserting “subsection (q)”.

(3) Section 202(e)(2)(A) of such Act (42 U.S.C. 402(e)(2)(A)) is amended by striking “subsection (k)(5), subsection (q),” and inserting “subsection (q)”.

(4) Section 202(f)(2)(A) of such Act (42 U.S.C. 402(f)(2)(A)) is amended by striking “subsection (k)(5), subsection (q)” and inserting “subsection (q)”.

SEC. 3. Repeal of windfall elimination provisions.

(a) In general.—Section 215 of the Social Security Act (42 U.S.C. 415) is amended—

(1) in subsection (a), by striking paragraph (7);

(2) in subsection (d), by striking paragraph (3); and

(3) in subsection (f), by striking paragraph (9).

(b) Conforming amendments.—Subsections (e)(2) and (f)(2) of section 202 of such Act (42 U.S.C. 402) are each amended by striking “section 215(f)(5), 215(f)(6), or 215(f)(9)(B)” in subparagraphs (C) and (D)(i) and inserting “paragraph (5) or (6) of section 215(f)”.

SEC. 4. Effective date.

The amendments made by this Act shall apply with respect to monthly insurance benefits payable under title II of the Social Security Act for months after December 2023. Notwithstanding section 215(f) of the Social Security Act, the Commissioner of Social Security shall adjust primary insurance amounts to the extent necessary to take into account the amendments made by section 3.

== Legislative history ==
The bill was introduced multiple times in various Congresses before its final passage in December 2024.

Congress	Short title	Bill number(s)	Date introduced	Sponsor(s)	# of cosponsors	Latest status
107th Congress	Social Security Fairness Act of 2002	H.R. 1464	September 18, 2002	Todd Russell (R-PA)	3	Died in committee
107th Congress	Social Security Fairness Act of 2001	S. 5404	October 10, 2001	Dianne Feinstein (D-CA)	14	Died in committee
108th Congress	Social Security Fairness Act of 2003	H.R. 147	February 11, 2003	Howard McKeon (R-CA)	300	Died in committee
108th Congress	Social Security Fairness Act of 2003	S. 619	February 5, 2003	Dianne Feinstein (D-CA)	30	Died in committee
109th Congress	Social Security Fairness Act of 2005	H.R. 147	January 4, 2005	Howard McKeon (R-CA)	327	Died in committee
109th Congress	Social Security Fairness Act of 2005	S. 619	March 14, 2005	Dianne Feinstein (D-CA)	29	Died in committee
110th Congress	Social Security Fairness Act of 2007	H.R. 82	January 4, 2007	Howard Berman (D-CA)	352	Died in committee
110th Congress	Social Security Fairness Act of 2007	S. 206	January 9, 2007	Dianne Feinstein (D-CA)	38	Died in committee
111th Congress	Social Security Fairness Act of 2009	H.R. 1332	January 7, 2009	Howard Berman (D-CA)	334	Died in committee
111th Congress	Social Security Fairness Act of 2009	S. 2010	February 25, 2009	Dianne Feinstein (D-CA)	31	Died in committee
112th Congress	Social Security Fairness Act of 2011	H.R. 1332	April 1, 2011	Howard McKeon (R-CA)	170	Died in committee
112th Congress	Social Security Fairness Act of 2011	S. 2010	December 16, 2011	John Kerry (D-MA)	18	Died in committee
113th Congress	Social Security Fairness Act of 2013	H.R. 1795	April 26, 2013	Rodney Davis (R-IL)	136	Died in committee
113th Congress	Social Security Fairness Act of 2013	S. 896	May 8, 2013	Mark Begich (D-AK)	20	Died in committee
114th Congress	Social Security Fairness Act of 2015	H.R. 973	February 13, 2015	Rodney Davis (R-IL)	159	Died in committee
114th Congress	Social Security Fairness Act of 2015	S. 1651	June 23, 2015	Sherrod Brown (D-OH)	25	Died in committee
115th Congress	Social Security Fairness Act of 2017	H.R. 1205	February 21, 2017	Rodney Davis (R-IL)	195	Died in committee
115th Congress	Social Security Fairness Act of 2017	S. 915	April 24, 2017	Sherrod Brown (D-OH)	27	Died in committee
116th Congress	Social Security Fairness Act	H.R. 141	January 3, 2019	Rodney Davis (R-IL)	264	Died in committee
116th Congress	Social Security Fairness Act of 2019	S. 560	February 14, 2019	Sherrod Brown (D-OH)	38	Died in committee
117th Congress	Social Security Fairness Act of 2021	H.R. 82	January 4, 2021	Rodney Davis (R-IL)	305	Died in committee
117th Congress	Social Security Fairness Act of 2021	S. 1302	April 22, 2021	Sherrod Brown (D-OH)	42	Died in committee
118th Congress	Social Security Fairness Act of 2023	H.R. 82	January 9, 2023	Garret Graves (R-LA)	323	Passed
118th Congress	Social Security Fairness Act of 2023	S.597	March 1, 2023	Sherrod Brown (D-OH)	62	

== See also ==
- List of bills in the 113th United States Congress
- List of bills in the 114th United States Congress
- List of bills in the 115th United States Congress
- List of bills in the 116th United States Congress
- List of bills in the 117th United States Congress
