= Windfall Elimination Provision =

Statutory provision in United States law

The Windfall Elimination Provision (abbreviated WEP) was a statutory provision in United States law which affected benefits paid by the Social Security Administration under Title II of the Social Security Act. It reduced the Primary Insurance Amount (PIA) of a person's Retirement Insurance Benefits (RIB) or Disability Insurance Benefits (DIB) when that person was eligible or entitled to a pension based on a job which did not contribute to the Social Security Trust Fund. When it was in effect, it also affected the benefits of others claiming on the same social security record. It was repealed by the Social Security Fairness Act (H.R. 82) in 2025.

== History ==
The Social Security Amendments of 1983 (Public Law 98-21) provided for the WEP as a means of eliminating the "windfall" of social security benefits received by beneficiaries who also receive a pension based on work not covered by Social Security. The windfall in question refers to the subsidization of the PIA for beneficiaries with lower incomes throughout life. Prior to the institution of the WEP, beneficiaries who paid little into Social Security but were well paid outside of the system were given this subsidy.

== Applicability ==
The WEP applied to certain beneficiaries who were receiving RIB or DIB and who also:

- Became entitled to the benefits after 1985
- First became eligible after 1985 for a pension based upon earnings from employment that was not covered by Social Security
- Were still entitled to the pension, even if not yet claimed
- Were still alive
- Had not attained thirty Years of Coverage (YOCs) by the age of sixty-two.

== Computation ==
There were two ways that the WEP affected PIA: the Modified New Start 1978 Method and the Modified Old Start 1977 Method. Special rules applied to determine which method was used or if to use a different guaranteed PIAs.

=== Modified New Start 1978 Method ===
The following steps were taken in determining the WEP PIA with the Modified New Start 1978 Method: (See Primary Insurance Amount for clarification)

1. Calculate the Average Indexed Monthly Earnings (AIME).

2. Choose the percentage of the first bend-point to be the higher of the percentage based on the eligibility year or the percentage based on the YOCs acquired.

3. Calculate the PIA based on this, rounding down to the nearest dime.

4. Calculate the PIA normally and reduce by 50% of the amount of the non-covered pension's monthly payment.

5. Select the higher value given by steps 3 and 4.

==== Bend-point based on eligibility year ====
The effects of the WEP were phased in between 1986 and 1990. When calculating based on the year of eligibility, the year in which the beneficiary was eligible for both a Title II Social Security Benefit and the non-covered pension, the following chart shows the percentages applied before the first bend-point based on the first year that the beneficiary was eligible for both:

1986| 80%
1987| 70%
1988| 60%
1989| 50%
1990 or later| 40%

==== Bend-point based on YOCs acquired ====
When calculating based on YOCs acquired, the following chart shows what percentage to apply before the first bend-point:

YOCS | Percentage
30 + | 90% (full)
29 | 85%
28 | 80%
27 | 75%
26 | 70%
25 | 65%
24 | 60%
23 | 55%
22 | 50%
21 | 45%
20 - | 40%

=== Modified Old Start 1977 Method ===
The following steps were taken in determining the WEP PIA with the Modified Old Start 1977 Method: (See Primary Insurance Amount for clarification)

1. Compute the raw 1977 Simplified Old Start PIA.

2. Reduce the PIA to 50% and round down to the nearest dime.

3. Reduce the PIA from step 1 by 50% of the non-covered pension amount.

4. Select the larger of the PIA from steps 2 and 3.

=== Special Minimum PIA ===
The Special Minimum PIA, intended to assist individuals with low earnings over their working life, has been in effect on all benefits payable since January 1973. Since January 1979, it is calculated by subtracting 10 from the number of YOCs and multiplying that result by $11.50. That result is then adjusted for the cost of living, approximately equivalent to multiplying by $34.20 instead of $11.50 for 2008.

=== DIB Guarantee PIA ===
The 1977 amendments to the Social Security Act allowed for a DIB Guarantee PIA. Under these provisions, a future PIA used for any benefits after 1978 can be no smaller than:

  - The PIA in the last month of entitlement to DIB which terminated more than 12 months prior to entitlement to RIB, reentitlement to DIB, or death
  - The PIA in the last month of entitlement to DIB, adjusted for any intervening cost of living increases, if it terminated within 12 months of entitlement to RIB, reentitlement to DIB, or death
  - The PIA in the last month of entitlement to RIB, adjusted for any intervening cost of living increases, of a deceased beneficiary, if the beneficiary was converted from DIB to RIB at Full Retirement Age

Not all DIB Guaranteed PIAs are adjusted for the cost of living.

=== Applying the PIAs ===
The highest of these four PIA amounts is used on the record. The WEP PIA affected not only the benefits of the primary beneficiary on the record, but also that of any auxiliaries receiving benefits on the record. However, the WEP did not apply once the primary beneficiary had died, and survivor benefits were unaffected. Whereas Widow's and Widower's Benefits took into account the amount of benefits that the primary beneficiary may have received while living, a fictitious amount was created as if WEP did not apply for this purpose.

== Effects on benefits ==
When the WEP applied, it was used in determining all benefits on the record, both for the primary beneficiary and any auxiliaries. This included an effect upon the maximum total benefits paid on the record as well.

== Repeal ==
Since its passage, bills have been introduced in Congress almost every session to repeal this provision. In 2024, HR 82, the Social Security Fairness Act—repealing the WEP—passed both houses of Congress, and was signed by President Joe Biden on January 5, 2025.

According to the Congressional Research Service, approximately 2.1 million people were affected by the WEP as of December 2023. The law called for retroactive benefits to be paid back to January 2024 for individuals affected by the WEP. Opponents of this bill, such as the Committee for a Responsible Federal Budget, stated that this would hasten the point where Social Security payouts exceed taxes by six months. Others stated that repealing the WEP would reintroduce the ability of a windfall to be generated by higher-paid long-time public sector workers who work for a short time in a Social Security-covered position, thus increasing regressivity.

== Sources ==
Social Security Program Operations Manual System. Social Security Administration. https://s044a90.ssa.gov/apps10/poms.nsf/partlist!OpenView.

== See also ==
- Retirement Insurance Benefits
- Disability Insurance Benefits
- Social Security Government Pension Offset
