= Social Security Disability Benefits Reform Act of 1984 =

The Social Security Disability Benefits Reform Act of 1984 was signed into law by then-U.S. President Ronald Reagan on 9 October 1984. Its purpose was to ensure more accurate, consistent and uniform disability determination decisions under the Social Security Disability Insurance (SSDI) program, and to ensure that applicants were treated fairly and humanely. It has been described as "one of the key pieces of social welfare legislation" enacted toward the end of Reagan's first term in office.

== Origins ==
In 1981, Reagan ordered the Social Security Administration (SSA) to tighten up enforcement of the Disability Amendments Act of 1980 created by then President Jimmy Carter, which resulted in more than a million disability beneficiaries having their benefits stopped. This, as well as enforcement by the SSA of the Debt Collection Act of 1982, resulted in widespread public, media and federal court criticism of the agency. By 1984, the disability review process had nearly collapsed, and an internal SSA memo acknowledged that the agency's credibility was at an all-time low. This resulted in Congress creating the Reform Act, which had the effect of strengthening the legal position of SSDI beneficiaries.

== Overview ==
The Reform Act instituted a "medical improvement standard" that said benefits could only be terminated if certain conditions were met, and put the burden of proof on the Social Security Administration (SSA) to demonstrate that the individual was capable of engaging in "substantial gainful activity". It liberalized the screening process that applicants undergo in order to qualify for SSDI benefits, making it more subjective and complex. It directed the SSA, when assessing applications, to place increased weight on applicants' statements about their own pain and discomfort, to relax screening for mental illness, to consider multiple non-severe ailments to be disabling even if none were disabling by themselves, and to shift emphasis from the Social Security medical assessment towards the assessment of the applicant's own doctor. These changes had the effect of increasing the number of new SSDI awards and shifting their composition towards claimants with low-mortality disorders such as mental illness and back pain.

== Effects ==
In a 2006 analysis, Autor and Duggan wrote that the act has been the most significant factor in recent growth of SSDI usage. The share of the U.S. population receiving SSDI benefits has risen rapidly over the past two decades, from 2.2 percent of adults age 25 to 64 in 1985 to 4.1 percent in 2005.

== See also ==
- Social Security Administration
- List of Social Security legislation (United States)
- Social Security debate in the United States
