= Representative payee =

Concept in U.S. policy

A representative payee, or substitute payee, is a person who acts as the receiver of United States Social Security Disability or Supplemental Security Income for a person who is not fully capable of managing their own benefits, i.e. cannot be their own payee. The representative payee is expected to assist the person with money management, along with providing protection from financial abuse and victimization.

== Abuse ==
As with other examples of disability fraud, since the disabled person has presumed poor judgement, they are at risk of choosing, or letting others choose for them, a payee who takes advantage of them by using the benefits for themselves, either partially or entirely, leaving the disabled person deprived of adequate clothing, food, or shelter. Cases of such fraud or abuse are typically referred to Adult Protective Services (Child Protective Services in the case of minors), in addition to law enforcement. Notable cases of this include the 2011 Philadelphia basement kidnapping.

== Payee programs ==
Some US states and counties have set up representative, or substitute, payee programs, to allow psychiatric case workers and other professional care providers to manage their clients finances with more extensive oversight.
