= Philadelphia basement kidnapping =

2011 crime in Pennsylvania, United States

- Location: Tacony, Philadelphia, Pennsylvania, U.S.
- Date: October 17, 2011; 15 years ago (discovery)
- Attack type: Kidnapping
- Victim: 4
- Perpetrators: Jean McIntosh; Gregory Thomas; Linda Weston; Nicklaus Woodard; Eddie Wright
- Motive: Social Security Disability Insurance (suspected)
- Sentence: 40 years imprisonment (McIntosh); Life imprisonment plus 80 years (Weston); 27 years imprisonment (Wright)

The Philadelphia basement kidnapping, also known as the Basement of Horrors, describes the discovery of four people, being held against their will, in conditions of deprivation on October 17, 2011, in the basement of an apartment building in the Tacony neighborhood of Northeast Philadelphia, Pennsylvania, United States.

The owner of the building discovered the captives' presence after investigating suspicious activity in the basement area. Three people were arrested as initial suspects in the case: Linda Weston, Gregory Thomas and Eddie Wright. A fourth person, Jean McIntosh, the daughter of Weston, was arrested on October 19. Ten people, including six children, rescued on October 18 in connection with the discovery. A police investigator stated he had never seen such signs of abuse on a living person.

An investigation by the FBI and the Philadelphia Police Department is currently underway to determine if the suspects were part of a larger multi-state kidnapping scheme, as identifying papers of at least 50 other people were found in the initial search. Evidence so far suggests that people had been held for collection of their Social Security Disability benefits, as the four people initially found were mentally disabled.

== Victims ==
From approximately 2001 until October 2011, Weston and her co-conspirators lured intellectually disabled individuals, who were estranged from their families, into homes rented by Weston, Jean McIntosh, Eddie Wright and others in Philadelphia, Pennsylvania, Killeen, Texas, Norfolk, Virginia, and West Palm Beach, Florida. Weston made herself (in at least one instance by force), the victims’ Social Security Payee, allowing her to receive their disability benefits and State benefits.

The victims were confined in locked rooms, closets, basements, attics. They were often kept isolated, in the dark, not allowed to go to the bathroom and sedated by drugs secreted in the poor quality, meagre food and drinks they were given. If they tried to escape, steal food or resist their treatment, they were physically assaulted.

Two of the victims died:

1. Donna Spadea was targeted by Weston in April 2000. She was kept in the basement of a house in Philadelphia with other victims. After she was found to have died on June 6, 2005, Weston had other members of the household move her body to another part of the house before notifying the police.
2. Maxine Lee was found dead in a house in Norfolk Virginia in 2008. Linda Weston claimed to be Maxine's carer. They had met in 2002 and had a romantic relationship. Weston convinced Maxine to move in with her, however, once there she was confined to a kitchen cabinet and then an attic with Weston's other victims. In 2007, Weston made Maxine pretend to be intellectually disabled so she could receive her disability payments. After Maxine died, her body was taken upstairs to a bedroom, covered in a blanket and staged to look like she died whilst watching television. At the time, the medical examiner found she had died of bacterial meningitis and the police did not find any suspicious circumstances. The next day, Weston moved her other victims to Philadelphia. And she continued to receive Maxine's social security payments.

Other victims:

1. Beatrice Weston, daughter of Vicki Weston (Linda Weston's sister). Linda took Beatrice into her "care" when she was aged 10 and tortured for 8 years. She was found locked in a closet on the 3rd floor of the building, away from the other victims locked in the basement. She had open wounds and scars over her head, burn marks from a heated spoon, several malunited fractures and evidence of repeated shooting from pellet guns over her ankles. Police stated Linda took Beatrice from her sister as a result of a family feud. Vicki Weston later claimed that Beatrice had been taken into care by Philadelphia authorities and placed in the care of her aunt, Linda Weston. She attempted to sue the city for $50,000 in negligence and civil rights violations.
2. Edwin Sanabria went missing in 1999.

== Perpetrators ==
Weston had served four years in prison in the 1980s for starving a man to death after he refused to support Weston's sister's unborn child. She served four years of her sentence. She had been given a diagnosis of schizophrenia at the time. Records show a person living with Weston in 2008 died that year, from what was at the time listed as natural causes. The person's family has asked that her death be reexamined. In December 2011, more charges were filed against Weston.

McIntosh had been arrested in 2005 for unlawfully depositing a $3,200 check.

== Aftermath ==
The crime was discovered by a landlord.

The kidnapping received national and international attention, and raised awareness of the issue of the potential abuse of mentally disabled people for their benefits through the representative payee process.

In January 2013, the four original defendants, and a fifth, Nicklaus Woodard, of West Palm Beach, Florida, were charged by a federal grand jury with a total of 196 criminal counts, including hate crime charges. All five were charged with four counts of a hate crime, conspiracy, racketeering, and kidnapping. Weston, Mcintosh, and Thomas were charged with involuntary servitude. Weston was charged with two counts of murder, with confinement and abuse allegedly causing the deaths of two victims. In September 2015, she pleaded guilty to all 196 federal counts against her, including murder, kidnapping, sex trafficking, hate crimes, forced labor, and benefits fraud. In November, she was sentenced to life plus 80 years.

Jean McIntosh pleaded guilty in December 2014 to charges including conspiracy to commit racketeering, hate crimes against disabled people, and kidnapping resulting in death. In August 2018, she was sentenced to 40 years. The following month, Eddie Wright received 27 years.

== See also ==
- Adult Protective Services
- Disability fraud
- List of kidnappings (2000–2009)
- List of long-term false imprisonment cases
- List of solved missing person cases (1950–1969)
