= Office of the Chief Actuary =

The Office of the Chief Actuary is a government agency that has responsibility for actuarial estimates regarding social welfare programs. In Canada, the Office of the Chief Actuary works with the Canada Pension Plan and the Old Age Security Program. In the United States, the Social Security Administration has an Office of the Chief Actuary that deals with Social Security, and the Centers for Medicare and Medicaid Services have an Office of the Actuary that deals with Medicare and Medicaid. A similar agency in the United Kingdom is called the Government Actuary's Department (GAD).

== United States ==
=== Social Security Administration ===
In the U.S., the Office of the Chief Actuary at the Social Security Administration plans and directs a program of actuarial estimates and analyses relating to SSA-administered retirement, survivors and disability insurance programs and to proposed changes in those programs. It evaluates operations of the Federal Old-Age and Survivors Insurance Trust Fund and the Federal Disability Insurance Trust Fund, conducts studies of program financing, performs actuarial and demographic research on social insurance and related program issues, and projects future workloads.

In addition, the office is charged with conducting cost analyses relating to the Supplemental Security Income (SSI) program, a general-revenue financed, means-tested program for low-income aged, blind and disabled people. The Office provides technical and consultative services to the Commissioner, to the board of trustees of the Social Security Trust Funds, and its staff appears before Congressional Committees to provide expert testimony on the actuarial aspects of Social Security issues.

As of January 2025, the Chief Actuary of the Social Security Administration is Karen Glenn.
