= SGA =

SGA may refer to:

== Medicine and healthcare ==
- Second-generation antipsychotics
- Segesterone acetate, a progestin medication
- Small for gestational age, babies whose birth weight lies below the 10th percentile for that gestational age
- Supraglottic airway, an airway management device

== Companies and organizations ==
=== Aviation ===
- SGA, IATA code for Sheghnan Airport in Afghanistan
- SGA Airlines (Siam General Aviation), a regional airline in Thailand
- Swanson Group Aviation, a heavy lift helicopter operator of Glendale, Oregon, U.S.

=== Politics ===
- Schwarz-Gelbe Allianz (Black-Yellow Alliance), an Austrian political party
- Southern Governors' Association, formed in the United States in 1934 and dissolved in 2016

=== Other ===
- Society of Graphic Art, a British arts organization founded in 1919
- Songwriters Guild of America, an organization to help "advance, promote, and benefit" the profession of songwriters
- Strong Group Athletics, a basketball and volleyball team-sponsoring organization in the Philippines

== Entertainment and media ==
- Standard Galactic Alphabet, the writing system in the Commander Keen fictional universe
- Stargate Atlantis, an American-Canadian science fiction television series and a spin-off from the television series Stargate SG-1
- Swedish Game Awards, Sweden's largest video game development competition

== People ==
- Shai Gilgeous-Alexander (born 1998), Canadian professional basketball player

== Science and technology ==
- Samsung Galaxy Ace, an Android smartphone manufactured by Samsung
- Simple genetic algorithm
- Synthetic genetic array analysis, a high throughput methodology for studying genetic interactions
- System Global Area, a shared memory structure that is created by Oracle databases at instance startup

== Other uses ==
- SGA, ISO 639-2 & -3 code for Old Irish language
- SG&A, Selling, general and administrative expenses in income statements
- Same-gender attraction, an LGBTQ acronym
- Séminaire de Géométrie Algébrique du Bois Marie, an influential mathematical seminar and the series of books it produced
- Special Geographic Area of Bangsamoro, Philippines
- Student government association, a student organization dedicated to social and organizational activities of the student body
- Substantial gainful activity, a term defined by the U.S. Social Security Administration to describe work that involves physical or mental effort and is ordinarily done for pay
