= Sullivan v. Zebley =

- Supreme Court of the United States

Argued November 28, 1989 Decided February 20, 1990
- Full case name: Louis Wade Sullivan, Secretary of Health and Human Services v. Brian Zebley, et al.
- Citations: 493 U.S. 521 (more) 110 S. Ct. 885; 107 L. Ed. 2d 967; 1990 U.S. LEXIS 882

Case history
- Prior: Zebley v. Heckler, 642 F. Supp. 220 (E.D. Pa. 1986); vacated in part, Zebley v. Bowen, 855 F.2d 67 (3d Cir. 1988); cert. granted, 490 U.S. 1064 (1989).

Holding
- Substantial parts of the Supplemental Security Income regulations determining disability for children were inconsistent with the Social Security Act, particularly the statutory standard of “comparable severity.”

Court membership
- Chief Justice William Rehnquist Associate Justices William J. Brennan Jr. · Byron White; Thurgood Marshall · Harry Blackmun; John P. Stevens · Sandra Day O'Connor; Antonin Scalia · Anthony Kennedy

Case opinions
- Majority: Blackmun, joined by Brennan, Marshall, Stevens, O'Connor, Scalia, Kennedy
- Dissent: White, joined by Rehnquist

Laws applied
- 42 U.S.C. § 1381 et seq.

Sullivan v. Zebley, 493 U.S. 521 (1990), was a landmark decision by the United States Supreme Court involving the determination of childhood Social Security Disability benefits. In the decision, the Supreme Court ruled that substantial parts of the Supplemental Security Income program's regulation on determining disability for children were inconsistent with the Social Security Act, particularly the statutory standard of "comparable severity". The suit highlighted what some felt was the need for a step in the evaluation of childhood disability claims that would be akin to the functional evaluation considered in many adult claims. It resulted in the addition of a consideration of functioning, and not merely medical severity, in children's SSI claims. The decision was rendered on February 20, 1990.

== Background ==
The Zebley claim was originally denied by the state disability determination services (DDS) in Harrisburg, Pennsylvania. On July 12, 1983, plaintiffs, including Zebley, filed a class action complaint challenging the Social Security Administration (SSA) listing-only policy of evaluating childhood disability claims. Community Legal Services of Philadelphia represented the plaintiffs; Richard Weishaupt argued the case and Jonathan Stein was co-lead counsel, Sheldon Taubman was co-counsel.

On July 16, 1986, the United States District Court for the Eastern District of Pennsylvania granted, in part, the request of the Secretary of the HHS for summary judgment. The district court dismissed the class action lawsuit.

The case was subsequently appealed to the United States Court of Appeals for the Third Circuit. On August 10, 1988, the Third Circuit vacated the district court's dismissal of the class complaint and remanded the case to district court. In doing this, the Third Circuit found that SSA's interpretation of "comparable severity" was too restrictive and preclusive of an individualized assessment of children's functional impairments. In response, on February 15, 1989, SSA filed a petition for a writ of certiorari requesting the Supreme Court's review of the case.

== Court's opinion ==
After oral arguments on November 28, 1989, the Supreme Court issued its decision on February 20, 1990. By a 7 to 2 margin, the Supreme Court found SSA's listing-only methodology for determining SSI child claims inconsistent with the statutory standard of "comparable severity" set forth in the Social Security Act. The Court invalidated the SSA's regulations and rulings as they were found to not provide SSI child claimants with an individualized functional assessment similar to the functional analysis considered in many adult claims. The Court concluded that SSA could determine the effect of an impairment on a child's ability to perform age-appropriate activities in much the same way it determines the effect of impairments on an adult's ability to work.

== Impact of decision ==
Prior to Zebley, a child would only be found disabled under the SSA's definition if he or she medically met or equaled one of SSA's listings of impairments. Following the ruling, the childhood definition of disability was changed to having "an impairment resulting in marked and severe functional limitations."

Enrollment of disabled children on SSI dramatically increased following Zebley and its relaxation of SSA's definition of disability for children. The case is noted as part of the trend of the liberalization of welfare benefits occurring at the time of the ruling.

== See also ==
- Supplemental Security Income
- List of class action lawsuits
- List of United States Supreme Court cases, volume 493
- List of United States Supreme Court cases
- Lists of United States Supreme Court cases by volume
- List of United States Supreme Court cases by the Rehnquist Court
