= List of Social Security legislation (United States) =

- 1935 - Social Security Act, Pub. L. 74–271
- 1939 - Social Security Amendments of 1939, Pub. L. 76–379
- 1942 - Revenue Act of 1942, Pub. L. 77–753
- 1943 - Pub. L. 78–211
- 1943 - Revenue Act of 1943, Pub. L. 78–235
- 1945 - Federal Insurance Contributions Act, Pub. L. 78–495
- 1945 - Revenue Act of 1945, Pub. L. 79–214
- 1946 - Social Security Amendments of 1946, Pub. L. 79–719
- 1947 - Social Security Amendments of 1947, Pub. L. 80–379
- 1948 - Provision for Exclusion of Certain Newspaper and Magazine Vendors from Social Security Coverage, Pub. L. 80–492
- 1948 - Provision to Maintain Status Quo Concept of Employee, Pub. L. 80–642
- 1950 - Social Security Amendments of 1950, Pub. L. 81–734
- 1952 - Social Security Amendments of 1952, Pub. L. 82–590
- 1954 - Social Security Amendments of 1954, Pub. L. 83–761
- 1956 - Social Security Amendments of 1956, Pub. L. 84–880
- 1958 - Social Security Amendments of 1958, Pub. L. 85–840
- 1960 - Social Security Amendments of 1960, Pub. L. 86–778
- 1961 - Social Security Amendments of 1961, Pub. L. 87–64
- 1965 - Social Security Amendments of 1965, Pub. L. 89–97
- 1966 - Tax Adjustment Act of 1966, Pub. L. 89–368
- 1967 - Social Security Act Amendments, Pub. L. 90–248
- 1969 - Tax Reform Act of 1969, Pub. L. 91–172
- 1971 - Social Security Amendments, Pub. L. 92–5
- 1972 - Social Security Amendments, Pub. L. 92–336
- 1972 - Social Security Amendments of 1972 (Supplemental Security Income), Pub. L. 92–603
- 1973 - Social Security Benefits Increase, Pub. L. 93–233
- 1977 - Social Security Amendments of 1977, Pub. L. 95–216
- 1980 - Social Security Disability Amendments of 1980, Pub. L. 96–265
- 1980 - Reallocation of Social Security Taxes Between OASI and DI Trust Funds, Pub. L. 96–403
- 1980 - Retirement Test Amendments, Pub. L. 96–473
- 1981 - Omnibus Budget Reconciliation Act of 1981, Pub. L. 97–35
- 1981 - Social Security Amendments of 1981, Pub. L. 97–123
- 1983 - Internal Revenue Code of 1954 and Social Security Act, amendments. Pub. L. 97–455
  - This document describes minor changes: Social Security Tax rates on Virgin Islands income, Social Security Disability Changes (Benefits during Appeal, Periodic Reviews, Reconsiderations), and Offsets related to public pensions.
- 1983 - Social Security Amendments of 1983, Pub. L. 98–21
  - This document describes the massive 1983 changes affecting the financing of the Social Security system.
- 1984 - Social Security Disability Benefits Reform Act of 1984, Pub. L. 98–460
- 1985 - Balanced Budget and Emergency Deficit Control Act, Pub. L. 99–177
- 1986 - Omnibus Budget Reconciliation Act of 1986, Pub. L. 99–509
- 1987 - Omnibus Budget Reconciliation Act of 1987, Pub. L. 100–203
- 1988 - Technical and Miscellaneous Revenue Act of 1988, Pub. L. 100–647
- 1989 - Omnibus Budget Reconciliation Act of 1989, Pub. L. 101–239
- 1990 - Omnibus Budget Reconciliation Act of 1990, Pub. L. 101–508
- 1993 - Omnibus Budget Reconciliation Act of 1993, Pub. L. 103–66
- 1994 - Social Security Administrative Reform Act, Pub. L. 103–296
- 1994 - Social Security Domestic Reform Act, Pub. L. 103–387
- 1996 - Senior Citizens' Right to Work Act of 1996, Pub. L. 104–121 (text) (PDF)
- 1999 - Ticket to Work and Work Incentives Improvement Act, Pub. L. 106–170 (text) (PDF)
- 2000 - Senior Citizens' Right to Work Act of 2000, Pub. L. 106–182 (text) (PDF)

== See also ==
- List of United States federal legislation
- Social Security (United States)
- Social Security debate (United States)
