= Disability Determination Services =

Type of US state government agency

Disability Determination Services, commonly called DDS, are state agencies that are funded by the US federal government. Their purpose is to make disability findings for the Social Security Administration.

Applicants for Social Security Disability Insurance (SSDI) or Supplemental Security Income (SSI) file applications for disability benefits at local Social Security field offices.

If the application is accepted, it is sent to the DDS in the state where the applicant lives to have the claim of disability assessed.

The claim is either approved or denied at the DDS for disability qualification. The claim is then returned to the originating SSA office to finish its processing.

== Methods used ==
The following methods are used in determining a disability.

=== Applicant's own statement ===
The applicant is requested to provide information on the disability. During the application process, it is requested for the applicant to list all conditions that contribute to the disability and how they prevent employment.

Also, the applicant is mailed a questionnaire that contains questions about the applicant's activity before and after the applicant's disability, including daily activities and how the disability has affected the ability to perform them. Such activities include activities like dressing, bathing, grooming, food shopping, meal preparation, housekeeping, laundry, and transportation.

Approval is based on how the applicant's medical conditions impact the ability to earn an income. While an applicant's own words alone are usually not sufficient to qualify for approval, they can play an important role.

Personal statements can be of questionable validity. Applicants who have expertise in the system or can obtain help from an expert may be able to influence the decision by the use of particular words and phrases.

=== Medical records ===
The applicant's medical records are obtained from physicians involved in the current treatment of the applicant. The physicians provide information on the conditions for which the applicant is being treated and how they impede the applicant's ability to work.

In many cases, DDS will send the applicant to one or more physicians for a medical examination, which is paid by DDS. That most often occurs in the absence of a physician with an existing treating relationship with the applicant who can verify an impairment that is alleged by the applicant.

The examination verifies the information provided by other sources and provides a more up-to-date record of decisions.

=== Study of applicant's life ===
Staff of the DDS will often contact the applicant or other people who know the applicant to obtain descriptions of "Activities of Daily Living" (ADLs). They can be combined with the objective medical opinion and the opinions of medical sources to build an assessment of what the applicant can or cannot do in a typical day.

Rarely, in only a limited number of locations, an external investigation can be referred to a "Cooperative Disability Investigations" (CDI) unit. Such a referral is made only when fraud is suspected. The purpose is to corroborate that the applicant's statements reflect real-life activities. For example, there are cases of those filing for disability and falsely claiming to be unable to engage in various forms of physical activity. The fraudulent applicants are then observed performing tasks outside of a work setting that require the same skills. Such information could be used to then deny benefits.

The examiner and representatives may also call or otherwise obtain statements from those who are known to the applicant like relatives, friends, acquaintances, neighbors, co-workers, and teachers. The questions will be asked in a manner in which evidence may be corroborated.

== Decision made ==
The decision is made, based on whether or not the applicant can perform work that used to be done in the past or that the applicant is trained to do and is likely to be able to perform and find employment in the disability. It is for that reason that two people with identical disabilities may have very differing outcomes in their applications.

The legal definition of a disability that qualifies an applicant for benefits is "inability to engage in any substantial gainful activity because of any medically determinable physical or mental impairment which can be expected to result in death or which has lasted or can be expected to last for a continuous period of not less than 12 months." For adult applicants, Social Security Administration regulations specifies a five-step process for making the decision. A modified process is used in the case of children for whom Supplemental Security Income benefits are being claimed (as children are not expected to work).

For adults, part of the disability-determination process involves assessing the applicant's "residual functional capacity": what the applicant can do in spite of the disability. Factors that may be considered in determining the "residual functional capacity" may include the following:

- Known limitations caused by diagnosed medical conditions, which must be documented by a physician. Many medical conditions can be debilitating in one person but not in another. Almost all applications lacking a physician's documentation of a known condition are rejected.
- Symptoms of undiagnosed medical conditions documented by a physician. Like with diagnosed medical conditions, a physician must document how the symptoms are debilitating.
- Side effects and other limitations caused by treatment received by the medical conditions. The need to spend a significant amount of time in one's life to receive continual care instead of employment can be a qualifying factor.

Contrary to what many think, simply "being disabled" by any definition does not alone qualify one to automatically be approved. While one who can walk, talk, and manage one's own life may be considered disabled if there is no suitable employment for one's abilities, one with diminished mobility or mental capacity may not qualify if there is plentiful employment available with one's abilities.

One or more diagnosed medical conditions may not automatically qualify an applicant, and the lack of one or more may not disqualify the applicant. In some cases, an applicant may qualify based on symptoms alone.

In determining a physical disability, common factors are the ability to sit, stand, lift, bend, and stoop. Mental disabilities are determined based on the ability to communicate with others, understand oral and/or written instructions from others, and get along with others. One who can sit for prolonged periods but not stand, lift, bend, or stoop may be disqualified by being able to perform some type of desk work, and one may qualify without such an ability because of intellectual capacity, education level, or previous work experience. Likewise, a person with limited mental capacity who can perform physical labor may not qualify as "disabled."

Such skills are also used for applicants who have never worked and for whom the claim is that they can never work.

== See also ==
- Social Security (United States)
- State governments of the United States
