= Mark Duggan (economist) =

Professor of Economics at Stanford University

- Born: Mark Gregory Duggan; November 13, 1970 (age 55)
- Education: Massachusetts Institute of Technology (BS, MS); Harvard University (PhD)
- Children: 2
- Scientific career
- Fields: Economics
- Workplaces: Stanford University; University of Toronto
- Thesis: Public Policies and Private Behavior (1999)
- Doctoral advisors: Lawrence F. Katz; David Cutler; Martin Feldstein; Andrei Shleifer

Mark Gregory Duggan (born November 13, 1970) is the director of the Munk School of Global Affairs and Public Policy at the University of Toronto. Until August 2026, he was the Wayne and Jodi Cooperman Professor of Economics at Stanford University. He also served as director of the Stanford Institute for Economic Policy Research (SIEPR) for nine years, ending August 31, 2024.

== Education and career ==
Duggan received his B.S. and M.S. in electrical engineering from the Massachusetts Institute of Technology in 1992 and 1994, respectively. He went on to receive his Ph.D. in economics from Harvard University in 1999. He also joined the University of Chicago as an assistant professor of economics. In 2003, he left the University of Chicago to become an associate professor in the University of Maryland's economics department, where he became a full professor in 2007. From 2009 to 2010, he was a senior economist in the Obama administration's Council of Economic Advisers. In 2011, he left the University of Maryland to become a professor in the Department of Business Economics and Public Policy at the Wharton School of the University of Pennsylvania, where he was named the Rowan Family Foundation Professor in 2012. In 2014, he left the Wharton School to become The Wayne and Jodi Cooperman Professor of Economics at Stanford, as well as a senior fellow of SIEPR there in the same year. In September 2015, he became the director of SIEPR.

== Research ==
While at the University of Chicago, Duggan worked with Steven Levitt to study whether sumo wrestling matches in Japan were rigged, and published multiple studies on the relationship between gun ownership and rates of homicide and suicide. His research on gun ownership has found that it was positively related to the homicide rate, and that looser concealed carry laws do not reduce crime. More recently, he has published studies linking disability benefits programs, such as Social Security Disability Insurance and Supplemental Security Income, to high rates of unemployment.

== Personal life ==
Duggan is remarried, and has two children.
