= Substantial gainful activity =

Substantial gainful activity is a term used in the United States by the Social Security Administration (SSA). Being incapable of substantial gainful employment is one of the criteria for eligibility for Supplemental Security Income (SSI) or Social Security Disability Insurance (SSDI) benefits. It is known as the "SGA requirement," and is defined in Section 520 of the Social Security Act.

To be eligible for SSI, an applicant must meet the following three conditions: they must have little or no income or resources, be considered medically disabled, and either not be working or working but earning less than the substantial gainful activity level. To be eligible for SSDI, an applicant must have worked and paid Social Security taxes for enough years to be covered under Social Security, as well as being medically disabled and either not be working or working but earning less than the substantial gainful activity level.

Substantial gainful activity is defined by the Internal Revenue Service as "the performance of significant duties over a reasonable period of time while working for pay or profit, or in work generally done for pay or profit".

Inability to engage in substantial gainful activity means that if a person works, they earn less than a certain amount of money. For non-blind people, the amount set by the SSA for 2009-10 was $980 per month. If a claimant were to earn more than the set amount, they would no longer be considered disabled by the SSA, regardless of their medical condition, and their benefits would cease after two further disability checks.

Monthly substantial gainful activity amounts by disability type:
Year	Blind	Non-Blind	Year	Blind	Non-Blind	Year	Blind	Non-Blind	Year	Blind	Non-Blind
1975	$200	$200	1990	$780	$500	2005	$1,380	$830	2021	$2,190	$1,310
1976	$230	$230	1991	$810	$500	2006	$1,450	$860	2022	$2,260	$1,350
1977	$240	$240	1992	$850	$500	2007	$1,500	$900	2023	$2,460	$1,470
1978	$334	$260	1993	$880	$500	2008	$1,570	$940	2024	$2,590	$1,550
1979	$375	$280	1994	$930	$500	2009	$1,640	$980	2025	$2,700	$1620
1980	$417	$300	1995	$940	$500	2010	$1,640	$1,000			
1981	$459	$300	1996	$960	$500	2011	$1,640	$1,000			
1982	$500	$300	1997	$1,000	$500	2012	$1,690	$1,010			
1983	$550	$300	1998	$1,050	$500	2013	$1,740	$1,040			
1984	$580	$300	1999	$1,110	$700	2014	$1,800	$1,070			
1985	$610	$300	2000	$1,170	$700	2015	$1,820	$1,090			
1986	$650	$300	2001	$1,240	$740	2016	$1,820	$1,130			
1987	$680	$300	2002	$1,300	$780	2017	$1,950	$1,170			
1987	$680	$300	2002	$1,300	$780	2018	$1,970	$1,180			
1988	$700	$300	2003	$1,330	$800	2019	$2,040	$1,220			
1989	$740	$300	2004	$1,350	$810	2020	$2,110	$1,260			

SGA does not include any work a claimant does to take care of themselves, their families or home. It does not include unpaid work on hobbies, volunteer work, institutional therapy or training, attending school, clubs, social programs or similar activities: however, such unpaid work may provide evidence that a claimant is capable of substantial gainful activity. Earnings derived from criminal activity count in assessing whether someone is engaged in substantial gainful activity.
