= Ticket to Work =

American employment support service

The United States Social Security Administration's Ticket to Work and Self-Sufficiency Program is the centerpiece of the Ticket to Work and Work Incentives Improvement Act of 1999.

This free and voluntary program supports career development for people who receive Social Security disability benefits. The Ticket program helps move eligible beneficiaries toward financial independence by connecting them with service providers to receive employment-related services and supports to succeed in the workforce.

Anyone who is age 18 through 64 and receives Social Security Disability Insurance (SSDI) benefits under Title II of the Social Security Act and/or Supplemental Security Income (SSI) payments under Title XVI of the Social Security Act is eligible for the Ticket program. Beneficiaries may assign their Ticket to an Employment Network (EN) or receive services from the public Vocational Rehabilitation (VR) agency in the state in which they reside.

The service provider with whom the individual chooses to work verifies their eligibility. Eligibility status can also be determined by calling the Ticket to Work Help Line at 1-866-968-7842 / 1-866-833-2967 (TTY), Monday through Friday, 8 a.m. to 8 p.m. ET. Trained Help Line representatives answer questions about available work supports, including Social Security Work Incentives, and general questions about how earned income affects Social Security disability benefits. Help Line representatives may also provide a list of authorized service providers to callers.

The types of services offered to beneficiaries depend on the service provider they select to work with and their individual needs. Available services often include career counseling, job search and placement assistance, and ongoing employment support services. Other services, such as benefits counseling, transportation, and workplace accommodation assistance may also be available from the selected provider or through referrals to other organizations or agencies. Participants are free to choose a different service provider at any time.

== History ==
The Ticket to Work and Work Incentives Improvement Act of 1999 (the Act) provides eligible Social Security Disability Insurance (SSDI) and Supplemental Security Income (SSI) beneficiaries with a range of employment-related services to support their movement to financial independence through work. The Act also includes expedited reinstatement provisions and improvements to the extended Medicare and Medicaid buy-in provisions.

The Act directed the Commissioner of Social Security to establish a Ticket to Work and Self-Sufficiency program (Ticket to Work program or Ticket program). The Ticket program expands both the number and types of service providers available to people who receive SSDI and/or SSI. Through the Ticket program, approved employment providers earn cash payments based on the work-related achievements of the beneficiaries who sign up for their services. Additionally, the Act requires Social Security to evaluate the Ticket program. Based on program feedback, including a 2004 Mathematica Policy Research study, Social Security revised the Ticket regulations in 2008 to improve the program for both providers and beneficiaries.

== Ticket to Work: How It Works ==
The Ticket to Work (Ticket) program connects Social Security beneficiaries with disabilities ages 18 through 64 with free employment services. These services help disabled beneficiaries make informed decisions about working, prepare for work, find a job or maintain success at work. Program participants may receive career counseling, vocational rehabilitation, and/or job placement and training from an authorized Ticket service provider. Beneficiaries may contact several service providers before assigning their Ticket to a service provider. Both the beneficiary and their selected service provider must agree to work together.

=== Ticket to Work Service Providers ===
Ticket to Work service providers agree to help Social Security disability beneficiaries access employment supports and services. Service providers may offer career planning, benefits counseling, job placement, training or legal advocacy. The five types of service providers are:

1. State Vocational Rehabilitation (VR) agencies: VR agencies offer state services, such as intensive training, education, rehabilitation and other job supports for people with disabilities who want to work.
2. Employment Networks (ENs): ENs are public or private groups that sign an agreement with Social Security to provide free job support services to beneficiaries. ENs may offer career planning, job leads and job placement, and ongoing employment support.
3. Workforce ENs: Workforce ENs are part of a state's Public Workforce System. Workforce ENs may provide access to additional employment support services, including training programs and special programs for youth in transition and veterans.
4. Work Incentives Planning and Assistance (WIPA): WIPA projects offer free benefits counseling to Social Security disability beneficiaries to help them make informed choices about work. WIPA projects serve beneficiaries who: Are working
  - Have a job offer pending
  - Are actively interviewing for jobs
  - Had an interview in the past 30 days
  - Have a job interview scheduled in the next 2 weeks
  - Are veterans
  - Are ages 14–25, not necessarily actively pursuing work
5. Protection and Advocacy for Beneficiaries of Social Security (PABSS): PABSS organizations provide legal support, advocacy, and information to help beneficiaries resolve disability employment-related concerns. Services include:
  - Navigating organizations and services to support beneficiaries’ efforts to work and protect their rights, such as appealing decisions of a State VR agency or EN
  - Requesting reasonable accommodations in the workplace, college classes, training courses, and licensing programs
  - Assisting with other disability-based legal issues that are barriers to employment, such as transportation

==== Work Plans ====
Once the beneficiary and the service provider decide to work together, they will collaboratively develop a work plan to help the beneficiary reach their work goals and, eventually, a financially independent future.

The work plan, also referred to as an Individual Work Plan, Individual Employment Plan, or Individual Plan for Employment, outlines both the beneficiary's specific employment goal and the free services and supports from their Ticket program service provider. The beneficiary and service provider work together until the beneficiary reaches the goal in their work plan.

Many Employment Networks (EN) also offer ongoing support services after the beneficiary gets a job. Ongoing services often help the beneficiary keep their job, advance in the position, or get a more desirable job.

=== Making Timely Progress after Ticket Assignment ===
Timely progress is taking the agreed-upon steps toward employment within Social Security's timeframes. Examples of action steps are:

- Receiving the education and training necessary to succeed at work
- Becoming and staying employed
- Reducing dependence on Social Security Disability Insurance (SSDI) or Supplemental Security Income (SSI) payments
- Achieving earnings high enough to cause benefit payments to cease

The social security administration will periodically conduct a review called a Timely Progress Review (TPR) to determine whether a beneficiary is making "timely progress" under their Work Plan.

==== Continuing Disability Review ====
A Continuing Disability Review (CDR) is a routine claim review process that the social security administration uses to make sure a beneficiary's disability still meets Social Security disability benefits rules. Medical CDRs check the beneficiary's medical condition to see whether they still have a disability and confirm that they are still eligible for Social Security Disability Insurance (SSDI) or Supplemental Security Income (SSI) due to a disability.

A significant feature of the Ticket program is protection from a CDR for the Ticket participant. If a beneficiary participating in the Ticket program assigned their Ticket to an approved EN or State VR agency and has been found to be making "timely progress" in any TPR, Social Security will not conduct a medical CDR. However, if a beneficiary receives a notice that Social Security has scheduled a medical CDR before assigning their Ticket to a service provider, Social Security will continue with their scheduled medical review.

A beneficiary under a Ticket Assignment does not, however, enjoy protection from a CDR if the social security administration determines in a TPR that the beneficiary is not making "timely progress" under their Work Plan.

=== Social Security Work Incentives and Health Care ===
Social Security Work Incentives encourage beneficiaries to attempt work. Work Incentives help beneficiaries stay in control of their finances and healthcare benefits while they re-enter the workforce or go to work for the first time. Some Work Incentives help beneficiaries keep their health care coverage while working and others may also allow their cash payments to continue. Available Work Incentives vary for Social Security Disability Insurance (SSDI) and Supplemental Security Income (SSI) beneficiaries. Social Security's Red Book provides more information on the Work Incentives and keeping Medicare and Medicaid. Ticket to Work service providers also provide help with understanding available Work Incentives.

=== Work Incentives Seminar Event (WISE) ===
The Ticket program hosts monthly Work Incentives Seminar Event (WISE) webinars to provide Social Security disability beneficiaries with information to help them make decisions about working. Various Ticket program service providers discuss their services and supports on the webinars, as well as the benefits of working and factors to consider when contemplating employment. Some of the webinars address a range of disabilities, while others target specific disability types or age groups. The webinars offer beneficiaries employment resources and access to information 24 hours a day via an online archive.

== Program structure ==
Social Security contracts with a Ticket Program Manager (TPM) to assist with Ticket program administration. The TPM is responsible for:

- Outreach to beneficiaries, including the Ticket to Work Help Line
- Marketing the Ticket to Work program
- Communication with beneficiaries about the Ticket program
- Facilitating beneficiary access to Ticket program service providers, including Employment Networks (EN), State Vocational Rehabilitation (VR) agencies, Work Incentives Planning and Assistance (WIPA) projects, and Protection and Advocacy for Beneficiaries of Social Security (PABSS) organizations
- Recruiting experienced and highly qualified providers to participate as ENs
- Assisting Social Security in monitoring EN participation in the Ticket program
- Supporting Ticket assignments and EN and VR payments for services once a beneficiary is earning income at a level that justifies a payment, according to the Ticket program's predetermined standards
- Assisting Social Security in ensuring the quality and integrity of EN Ticket program services

On December 15, 2020, Cognosante was awarded a 5-year Ticket to Work Program Management support contract to serve as TPM.

== Assessment of Ticket to Work ==
The animus for the Ticket to Work was a belief that current social security disability laws and regulations were a disincentive for disability recipients to enter the work force. Specifically, Ticket to Work sought to increase the incentives and options for disability recipients to seek vocational rehabilitation to facilitate return to work. Ticket to Work also sought to address a belief that disability recipients were reluctant to try to work due to concerns about losing Medicare and/or Medicaid coverage.

The obvious metrics for assessing the success of Ticket to Work are: (i) the number of disability recipients who leave the disability rolls due to successful job placement under Ticket to Work, and (ii) the cost-benefit analysis of Ticket to Work (i.e., has it saved taxpayers money).

A number of assessments by various groups over the years - including the General Accounting Office GAO), the Congressional Research Service, and a private contractor - indicate the Ticket to Work has not been a success.

Key features of the various studies that indicate Ticket to Work has not been a success are as follows:

- Low Participation Rate. Only about 5 percent of eligible beneficiaries participated in Ticket to Work since its inception
- No Cost Savings Realized. The cost of the Ticket to Work exceeds savings by $806 million. In addition, the program appears to have generated $133 million in uncollected overpayments to beneficiaries.
- Few Participants Getting Off Disability. Participants in Ticket to Work were slightly more likely to leave the rolls (9.7 percent) than nonparticipants.

There appears to be little scholarship or research as to why Ticket to Work has been a failure. The premise underpinning the Ticket to Work - that improved work incentives and expanded medical coverage would result in significant reductions in the disability rolls - may in fact be wrong. Other explanations for disability recipient reluctance to participate in Ticket to Work include:

- Most disability recipients are in fact simply unable to work. In order to secure their disability benefits in the first place, claimants had to prove inability to work in any capacity.
- Alternatively it must be considered that many disability recipients may simply have no interest in working, due to a combination of facts such as status quo bias or a natural distrust for the government agency that denied their disability claim in the first place.
