= Social Security Amendments of 1965 =

1965 United States legislation establishing Medicare and Medicaid

- Other short titles: Health Insurance for the Aged Act; Old-Age, Survivors, and Disability Insurance Amendments of 1965
- Long title: An Act to provide a hospital insurance program for the aged under the Social Security Act with a supplementary health benefits program and an expanded program of medical assistance, to increase benefits under the Old-Age, Survivors, and Disability Insurance System, to improve the Federal-State public assistance programs, and for other purposes.
- Enacted by: the 89th United States Congress
- Effective: July 30, 1965

Citations
- Public law: 89-97
- Statutes at Large: 79 Stat. 286

Codification
- Acts amended: Social Security Act
- Titles amended: 42 U.S.C.: Public Health and Social Welfare
- U.S.C. sections amended: 42 U.S.C. ch. 7

Legislative history
- Introduced in the House as H.R. 6675 by Wilbur Mills (D–AR) on March 29, 1965; Committee consideration by House Ways and Means Committee; Passed the House on April 8, 1965 (313-115); Passed the Senate on July 9, 1965 (68-21); Reported by the joint conference committee on July 27, 1965; agreed to by the House on July 27, 1965 (307-116) and by the Senate on July 28, 1965 (70-24); Signed into law by President Lyndon B. Johnson on July 30, 1965

The Social Security Amendments of 1965, Pub. L. 89–97, 79 Stat. 286, enacted July 30, 1965, was legislation in the United States whose most important provisions resulted in creation of two programs: Medicare and Medicaid. The legislation initially provided federal health insurance for the elderly (over 65) and for financially challenged families.

== History ==
In 1912, Theodore Roosevelt included social insurance for sickness in the platform of his Progressive Party. Around 1915 the group American Association for Labor Legislation attempted to introduce a medical insurance bill to some state legislatures. The attempts were not successful, and as a result, controversy about national insurance came about. National groups supporting the idea of government health insurance included the AFL–CIO, the American Nurses Association, National Association of Social Workers, and the Socialist Party USA. The most prominent opponent of national medical insurance was the American Medical Association (AMA); others included the American Hospital Association, the United States Chamber of Commerce, and the Life Insurance Association of People.

The concept of national health insurance began in the early 20th century in the United States and then came to prominence during the Truman administration following World War II. Between 1958 and 1964, controversy grew and a bill was drafted. The signing of the act, as part of Johnson's Great Society, began an era with a greater emphasis on public health issues. Medicare and Medicaid became the country's first public health insurance programs. The legislation was vigorously opposed by the American Medical Association until it had been enacted, but the AMA obtained concessions and later co-operated in its implementation.

Many politicians were involved in drafting the final bill that was introduced to the United States Congress in March 1965. On July 30, 1965, President Lyndon B. Johnson signed the bill into law.

=== Previous administrations ===
In 1935, when President Franklin D. Roosevelt signed the Social Security Act, medical benefits were left out of the bill. The committee that Roosevelt appointed to study issues related to Social Security wanted to include health insurance in the bill. However, the committee was concerned that amending the bill to include health insurance would kill the entire bill. Harry Truman took on the idea of national medical care and tried to integrate it into his Fair Deal program. Truman's attempts were also unsuccessful, but during his presidency, the fight for national medical care became specific to the aged population.

Once the targeted age was decided, a lengthy debate began over presenting a coherent medical care bill to Congress. The Conservative Coalition dominated the House Ways and Means Committee, which complicated attempts to pass social health programs. Wilbur Mills (D-AR), the chair of the committee, later played a role in creating the health care program that was integrated into the Social Security Act.

In 1960, the Kerr–Mills Act created the Medical Assistance for the Aged (MAA), a program that gave states the power to decide which patients needed financial assistance. The federal government would provide matching funds to the states for the program. Some states did not participate in or abide by the Act. Another preliminary bill, the King–Anderson Bill, was introduced in 1962. Under it, some hospital and nursing home costs for patients 65 and older would have been covered. Although the bill was defeated in committee, the vote was narrow (12–11), signaling a shift in attitudes.

=== Johnson administration ===
With the election of Lyndon B. Johnson in 1964, Democrats controlled both the presidency and the Congress, claiming a 2:1 ratio to Republicans in the House and 32 more seats in the Senate. The Democrats in the House Ways and Means Committee shifted away from Southern Democrats, making the committee more sympathetic towards health insurance reform.

Those who had worked on the King–Anderson Bill drafted a new bill providing coverage of the aged, limited hospitalization and nursing home insurance benefits, and Social Security financing. Wilbur Cohen, Assistant Secretary for Legislation of the Department of Health, Education and Welfare (and later Secretary), pushed the Medicare bill. Cohen convinced Johnson to give the bill high priority, and Johnson declared its importance to his Great Society program. The bill was introduced as companion bills, H.R. 1 and S. 1, with the numbers being the first bills introduced in each house of a new Congress.

=== House of Representatives ===
The groups previously opposed to the legislation switched their focus from opposing the bill to creating new versions of it. As a result, three forms of the bill emerged: John Byrnes's, the American Medical Association's, and the administration's bill (known as Medicare). Byrnes was a Republican committee member who proposed for doctors' services and drugs to be financed; participation in coverage would be voluntary for the aged. An elderly patient who needed the help would have financing "scaled to the amounts of the participant's Social Security cash benefits," and the financing would come from the government's revenues. The AMA proposed Eldercare, which provided government financing for physician's services, surgical charges, drugs, nursing home costs, X-ray and lab services. When brought back to the Ways and Means committee, three bills were presented: Byrnes's, Eldercare, and Medicare.

When deliberations began in 1965, both AMA members and their suggestions were rejected. Wilbur Mills, the chair of the Ways and Means committee, suggested combining Byrnes's ideas and Medicare. His committee took on the task of drafting H.R. 6675, the bill that ultimately became law. In combining the two bills, Byrnes's suggestion, which included lower taxes, had to be altered as higher taxes were necessary for the program's predicted costs. The Ways and Means Committee reported favorably on the new bill to the full House of Representatives on March 29 after a straight-party committee vote of 17 to 8.

During debate on the House floor, Republicans offered a substitute bill that would have made participation fully voluntary. It was narrowly defeated 236 to 191, with 128 of 138 Republicans in favor of the substitute. H.R. 6675 was passed in the House on April 8, 1965, by a vote of 313 to 115.

=== Senate ===
The biggest threat to the passage of H.R. 6675 in the Senate came from liberal Democrats who were eager to expand coverage of the bill. As amended and passed in the Senate on July 19 by a vote of 68 to 21, H.R. 6675 would have cost approximately $800 million more than the House bill.

=== Final passage ===
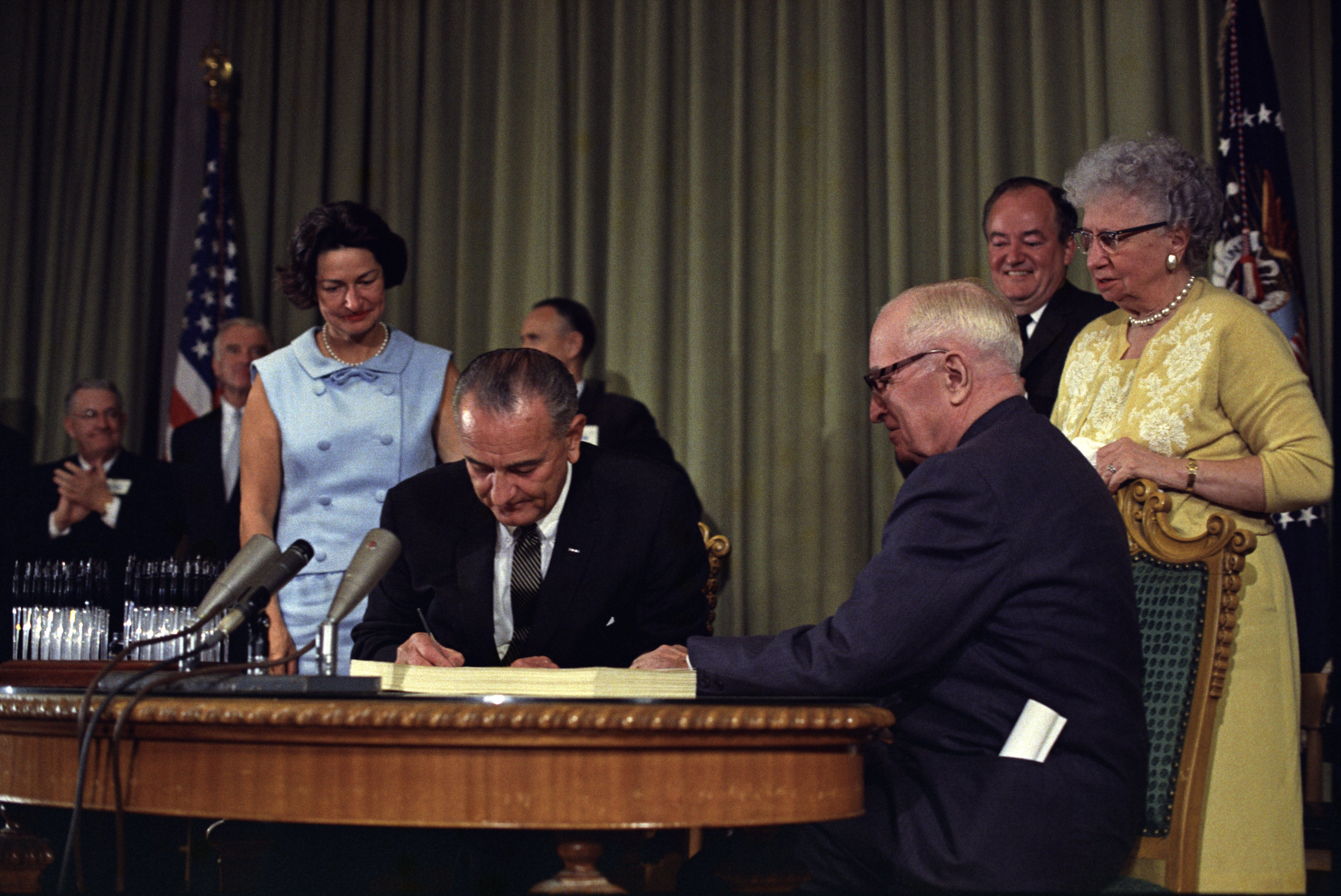
Johnson signing the amendment in front of Senator Edward V. Long, Lady Bird Johnson, Senator Mike Mansfield, Vice President Hubert Humphrey, former president Harry S. Truman and former first lady Bess Truman

The bill went to a conference committee at which Mills worked to eliminate practically all of the Senate amendments. The bill went through more than 5 amendments before being passed by majority vote in the House (307–116) on July 27 and in the Senate on July 28 (70–24).

The legislation made two amendments to the Social Security Act of 1935. Title XVIII, which became known as Medicare, includes Part A, which provides hospital insurance for the aged, and Part B, which provides supplementary medical insurance. Title XIX, which became known as Medicaid, provides for the states to finance health care for individuals who were at or close to the public assistance level with federal matching funds.

On July 30, 1965, Johnson signed the bill, making it Public Law 89–97. The signing took place in Independence, Missouri and was attended by Truman. Johnson credited Truman with "planting the seeds of compassion and duty which have today flowered into care for the sick and serenity for the fearful." Implementation of the amendments required extensive data processing and the reconfiguration of hospital policies nationwide.

== Effects ==
In the late 1960s and the early 1970s, the federal government doubled the number of physicians trained in the U.S. from 8,000 to 16,000 a year. There was a hospital building boom that moved from inpatient wards to one- and two-patient hospital rooms.
