= Supplemental Security Income =

United States government program

Poster by the Social Security Administration encouraging individuals to see if they are eligible for SSI

Supplemental Security Income (SSI) is a means-tested program that provides cash payments to disabled children, disabled adults, and individuals aged 65 or older who are citizens or nationals of the United States. SSI was created by the Social Security Amendments of 1972 and is incorporated in Title 16 of the Social Security Act. The program is administered by the Social Security Administration (SSA) and began operations in 1974.

Individuals or their helpers may start the application for SSI benefits by scheduling an appointment with SSA. Appointments may be scheduled by calling SSA's toll-free number, 1-800-772-1213.

SSI was created to replace federal-state adult assistance programs that served the same purpose, but were administered by the state agencies and received criticism for lacking consistent eligibility criteria. The restructuring of these programs was intended to standardize the eligibility requirements and level of benefits. Although administered by SSA, SSI is funded from U.S. Treasury general funds, not the Social Security Trust Fund. As of May 2025, the program provides benefits to over seven million Americans.

== History ==
The legislation creating the program was a result of President Richard Nixon's effort to reform the nation's welfare programs. At that time, each state had somewhat different programs under the Aid to the Blind, Aid to the Permanently and Totally Disabled, and Aid to the Elderly. These programs, which received federal funding, were created as part of the original Social Security Act of 1935. The Nixon administration thought these programs should be federalized and run by the Social Security Administration. Thus, SSI was created to eliminate the differences between the states including different disability standards and income and resources requirements, which many perceived as irrational or unfair. President Nixon signed the Social Security Amendments of 1972 on October 30, 1972, which created the SSI Program.

The SSI program officially began operations in January 1974 by federalizing states' programs, designating the Social Security Administration (SSA) to administer the SSI program. SSA was selected because it had been administering a nationwide adult disability program under the Social Security Disability Insurance Benefits (DIB) program since 1956 for workers who are insured through their payroll deduction under the Old Age, Survivors, and Disability Insurance (OASDI) programs associated with Federal Insurance Contributions Act (FICA) payroll taxes.

The initial benefit levels for SSI in 1972 were approximately the same as the average monthly benefit as a retired worker under the Social Security retirement benefits program. In August 1974, Congress established legislation to automatically increase SSI benefits by the same percentage and at the same time as Social Security retirement, survivors, and disability benefits. In 2026, the maximum SSI benefit for an individual ($994) was about 48 percent of the average monthly benefit of retired workers ($2,071) in the Social Security retirement benefits program. Although both Social Security and SSI benefits are adjusted for price inflation, initial Social Security benefits are computed by using wage indexing. Because wages tend to grow faster than prices, the maximum SSI benefit will continue to decline relative to benefit levels in the Social Security program.

The maximum SSI benefit in 2026 for an individual ($994) is below the federal poverty standard for an individual in the United States (about $1,304 per month). Because both the SSI amount and the poverty standard are indexed to price inflation, this will continue to be true in the future, in the absence of legislative changes. With SSI income and other sources of family income, about 42 percent of persons on SSI are poor.

Historians Edward D. Berkowitz and Larry DeWitt argue that, while "critics often accused the U.S. social welfare system of skewing benefits toward the middle class, rather than the truly needy", SSI successfully targeted benefits to economically vulnerable groups such as minorities. In 2024, African Americans made up about 25 percent of the adult SSI population (about 13.7 percent of the overall U.S. population is African American). Among SSI recipients 75 or older, 20 percent are Asian American, 16 percent are African American, and 21 percent are Hispanic.

Disabled children have been categorically eligible for SSI since the program's beginning. Sullivan v. Zebley was a landmark Supreme Court decision in 1990 that led to additional children qualifying for SSI based on disability. Brian Zebley had brain damage at birth, resulting in mental and physical problems including visual problems and partial paralysis. The Supreme Court found that SSA improperly denied him benefits and concluded that SSA must consider how health impairments affect functioning in children when making disability decisions. A study in 2020 found that, relative to other children, SSI child beneficiaries have "high rates of poverty, near poverty, material hardship, hospitalization, mortality, and adverse schooling outcomes". A study in 2019 found that infant mortality rates for SSI child applicants are about five times that of all children.

Although there are some exceptions, generally individuals must reside in one of the 50 states, the District of Columbia, or the Northern Mariana Islands to receive SSI benefits. The Northern Mariana Islands became a U.S. territory in 1976 (after the SSI program began) and the covenant establishing its territorial status included eligibility for SSI. The territories of Guam, Puerto Rico, and the U.S. Virgin Islands are eligible for federal grants to support the "aged, blind, and disabled" but residents are not eligible for SSI. In April 2022, the Supreme Court ruled (in United States v. Vaello Madero) that it is constitutional to exclude residents of Puerto Rico from the SSI program, as the territory does not pay most federal taxes.

Currently, about 96 percent of SSI recipients are citizens of the United States. Prior to the Personal Responsibility and Work Opportunity Reconciliation Act of 1996 (PRWORA), which placed several restrictions on noncitizen eligibility for SSI, about 88 percent of SSI recipients were US citizens.

For adults who are married, SSA will sometimes pay a benefit based on a couple amount. This would occur if both members of a couple meet the categorical requirements of eligibility (for example, both members of the couple are disabled according to the program's definition of disability). In these cases, the benefit payable to a couple is smaller than the combined benefits payable to two individuals in order to take account of the fact that two people living together can live more economically than if each lived alone. However, the reduced SSI couple benefit applies only to those who are legally married, which gives beneficiaries an incentive not to marry.

During the second Trump Administration, the Social Security Administration underwent significant internal changes, including the loss of roughly 13% of its staff and an effort to move many services online Researchers found that these changes made the process of claiming SSI benefits significantly more difficult.

== Eligibility ==
In order to receive SSI benefits, individuals must apply for benefits and meet the following requirements:

- They are 65+ years of age or blind or disabled; and
- They legally reside in one of the fifty states or the District of Columbia or Northern Mariana Islands, are the child of military parents assigned to permanent duty outside of the US, or are a student (certain restrictions apply) temporarily abroad; and
- They have income and resources within certain limits (see subsections).

For eligibility based on age, applicants must establish they are 65 or older. For eligibility based on disability, applicants must provide evidence they meet the Social Security Administration's definition of disability. With regard to adult disability cases, the Social Security Administration (SSA) determines whether an individual has a disability that prevents working, at a substantial level, in the national economy. For child disability cases, SSA determines whether the child has "marked" or severe functional limitations. The initial decision as to whether an individual is disabled is made by the various state Disability Determination Services (DDS), which contract with the federal government and must follow federal rules regarding the definition of disability. Individuals denied disability benefits at the initial level have appeal rights. Appealed cases may be heard by administrative law judges, SSA's Appeals Council, and the federal courts.

In some cases, individuals may be eligible for Social Security benefits and SSI benefits. For example, a disabled individual who worked in Social Security covered employment and who has limited income and resources may receive a Social Security disability benefit (due to employment prior to disability) and a partial SSI benefit (due to limited income and resources). The Social Security Administration treats an application for SSI to also be an application for any Social Security benefit for which the individual is eligible. In general, however, SSI differs from Social Security because SSI pays benefits to individuals who have limited income and resources. There is no requirement that the individual worked in Social Security covered employment.

=== Application for benefits ===
An application must be filed with the Social Security Administration (SSA) before an individual can receive SSI. Individuals or their helpers may start the application for SSI benefits by:

- Calling SSA's national toll-free number (1-800-772-1213)
- Calling a local Social Security office

=== Aged, disabled, or blind ===
In order to be eligible for SSI, a person must meet the definition of being aged, disabled, or blind.

Aged – Being deemed aged consists of attaining the age of 65 or older. In some cases benefits can be claimed at the age of 62. The Social Security Administration, like the United States Government in general, follows English common law and considers a person to attain an age the day before their birthday.

Disabled – Being deemed disabled consists of meeting the general disability definition used by the Social Security Administration to be eligible for SSDI:

"Disability means inability to engage in any SGA [substantial gainful activity] by reason of any medically determinable physical or mental impairment which can be expected to result in death, or has lasted or can be expected to last for a continuous period of not less than 12 months."

"The 1967 amendments specified that workers shall be determined to be under a disability only if the physical or mental impairment or impairments are of such severity that the individual is not only unable to do his previous work but cannot, considering his age, education, and work experience, engage in any other kind of substantial gainful work which exists in the national economy. This is regardless of whether any of these are true:

- Such work exists in the immediate area in which the claimant lives.
- A specific job vacancy exists.
- The claimant would be hired if they applied for work.

"The statute also specifies that 'work which exists in the national economy means work which exists in significant numbers either in the region where such individuals live or in several regions of the country.'"

Substantial gainful activity (SGA), for 2021, is the ability to earn $1,310 gross income in a month's period for most disabled individuals. For legally blind individuals, the SGA is $2,190, but applies only to SSDI and not SSI.

In addition, children under the age of 18 can be determined to be disabled for SSI purposes "if the individual has a medically determinable impairment or combination of impairments that causes marked or severe functional limitation(s), and can be expected to result in death, or has lasted or can be expected to last for a continuous period of not less than 12 months."

Blind – Being deemed blind consists of meeting the following definition:

"central visual acuity of 20/200 or less in the better eye with the use of a correcting lens. An eye which has a limitation in the field of vision such that the widest diameter of the visual field subtends an angle no greater than 20 degrees should also be considered as having a central visual acuity of 20/200 or less."

In addition, for SSI purposes, an individual is considered blind regardless of the period of time they are expected to be blind or if they are performing substantial gainful activity.

=== Income ===
One of the requirements to receive SSI is that the individual's income must be below certain limits. These limits may vary based on the state in which the individual lives, living arrangements, the number of people living in the residence, and the type of income. Not all income is counted when determining an individual's "countable income" for SSI eligibility purposes. Certain payments such as: grants, scholarships, SNAP benefits, home energy assistance, and small infrequent payments are not included.

=== Resources ===
Another requirement for SSI is that the individual's resources be below a certain limit. This amount is $2,000 for an individual and $3,000 for an individual and their spouse (whether the spouse is eligible for SSI or not), $4,000 for a child applicant with one parent living in the household, and $5,000 for a child applicant with two parents living in the household. However, conditional benefits may be paid if a substantial portion of the resources are considered non-liquid, resources that cannot be sold within 20 working days, if they agree to sell the resources at their current market value within a specified period and repay the money after the non-liquid property is sold. However, not all actual resources are counted in calculating an individual's or couple's resources for SSI purposes.

The resource limits were originally set at $1,500 for an individual and $2,500 for couples in 1974, and were not linked to inflation. In 1987, the limits were raised to $1,800 and $2,700, in 1988, to $1,900 and $2,850, and, in 1989, to $2,000 and $3,000. Under current law they will remain at present levels indefinitely.

The one exception to the general asset limit is the ABLE account, which was established with the signing into law of the ABLE Act of 2014 (standing for Achieving a Better Life Experience Act) on December 19, 2014. This tax-advantaged account was codified under the newly added Section 529A of the Internal Revenue Code. Details of the accounts, which officially came into effect once the Treasury Department issued enabling regulations and states passed legislation regarding account administration, are:

- Accounts can be established by or on behalf of a disabled person, provided that the beneficiary's disability began before age 26.
- Annual contributions to an account are limited to the same amount as the gift tax exclusion for an individual ($15,000 since 2014). The upper limit for lifetime contributions is the same as that for a 529 educational plan in the disabled person's state of residence. Contributions are not tax-deductible, but income earned in an account is not subject to tax.
- Tax-free withdrawals can be made for "qualified disability expenses", including but not limited to education, housing, transportation, employment-related expenses, assistive technology, and healthcare.
- There are special statutory rules regarding the accumulation of ABLE account assets for individuals on SSI and Medicaid. The first $100,000 in an ABLE account is not counted as an asset for purposes of SSI eligibility. Once an ABLE account balance exceeds $100,000, the beneficiary's SSI payments are suspended until the account balance drops below $100,000. However, the beneficiary remains covered by Medicaid regardless of the account balance.

=== Residency ===
SSI benefits are not paid solely to US citizens, but may also be paid to aliens legally residing in the United States. Conversely, citizens may find themselves ineligible because they do not currently reside within the United States; exceptions apply for children of military parents who were born overseas, were disabled or became blind overseas, or first applied for benefits overseas and for students studying abroad who were eligible for SSI in the month prior to leaving the US, whose absence will be for less than one year, and who are studying to enhance their ability to perform substantial gainful activity, sponsored by an educational institution in the US, and would not be available to the individual in the US. Several restrictions apply to the eligibility of aliens however. These include being in a "qualified alien" category and meeting an exception condition.

There are seven categories of qualified aliens based on Department of Homeland Security (DHS) immigration statuses. This includes:

- those admitted as Lawfully admitted for permanent residence (LAPR)
- those granted conditional entry pursuant to section 203(a)(7) of the Immigration and Nationality Act (INA)
- those paroled into the US under section 212(d)(5) of the INA for a period of at least one year
- those who are refugees admitted to the US under section 207 of the INA
- those granted asylum under section 208 of the INA
- those whose deportation is being withheld under sections 243(h) or 241(b)(3) of the INA
- Cuban/Haitian entrants under section 501(e) of the Refugee Education Assistance Act of 1980.

There are five exception conditions. These include:

- having already been receiving SSI on August 22, 1996
- having 40 qualifying credits (using SSI as a supplement to Retirement or Disability Insurance Benefits) when in LAPR status
- being a veteran, active-duty member of the U. S. military service, or being the spouse or dependant child of an individual who is
- having been lawfully residing in the US on August 22, 1996, and being blind and disabled (excluding aged individuals)

In order to qualify for SSI, an immigrant must have been a legal resident of the United States before the Welfare Reform Act of 1996 took effect (August 22, 1996). Those who arrived after that date may be denied SSI benefits. However, the regulations governing alien eligibility for SSI are complex and contain many exceptions; for instance, asylees, refugees, spouses of a member of the U.S. military, and some LAPR may be qualified aliens. A person who has been in LAPR status for at least five years, has a valid Form I-551 (Green card status) issued by the Bureau of Citizenship and Immigration, and has been employed in the United States, may qualify. People wishing to learn whether they might qualify for SSI should contact the Social Security Administration to schedule an appointment for an interview.

A person who is incarcerated for a calendar month is ineligible for benefits. If the person is in a medical facility where at least 50% of their costs are paid by Medicaid, their benefit may be reduced to $30.

=== Collateral consequences of warrants, parole, and probation ===
Since Congress enacted "fugitive felons" and parole/probation violation provisions in 1996, the Social Security Administration has suspended benefits and charged overpayments to individuals receiving SSI on the basis of outstanding warrants. Enforcement of the provisions greatly increased in 2000, as SSA reached agreements with local law enforcement to match databases.

Individuals who are fleeing to avoid prosecution or incarceration for a felony or violating probation or parole are statutorily prohibited from receiving SSI or Title II Social Security benefits.

The Social Security Administration interpreted the statutes broadly to include individuals whose names were matched against a warrant database. Some individuals lost benefits even though the warrant in question was for a different person. For others, the presence of a warrant did not necessarily mean that an individual was "fleeing," or that the individual had violated probation or parole.

As a result of two legal cases (Martinez v. Astrue and Clark v. Astrue), the SSA may not suspend benefits based merely on the evidence that a warrant had been issued. Back benefits were owed to hundreds of thousands of recipients.

== Benefit details ==
=== Amounts ===
The SSI program (or Title XVI of the Social Security Act 1611) provides monthly federal cash assistance of up to $994 for an individual and $1,491 for a couple (as of 2026) to help meet the costs of basic needs of food, shelter, and clothing.

In most states, SSI eligibility usually assures concurrent access to important medical coverage under the various state Medicaid programs and sometimes access to Section 8 housing benefits. In some states, supplemental payments are made by the state, increasing the cash assistance available through SSI. For example, the state of California (through its State Supplementation Program or SSP) increases the cash assistance, making the total 2025 SSI benefit for an individual $1,206.94 per month and $2,057.83 for a couple per month.

Amount calculation

SSI takes the income and resources of the applicant or recipient into consideration when calculating their benefit amount. Resources are determined at the first of the month. If an individual reduces their countable resources below the limit through investing in excluded resources, they will remain eligible. Excluded resources are resources such as: household goods, personal effects, up to one vehicle, and the home the applicant lives in.

An individual's monthly benefit will be calculated by subtracting their "countable income" from the maximum benefit amount. "Countable income" is an individual's income after applying any appropriate exclusions. It includes earned, unearned, in-kind, and deemed income.

- Earned Income: This is a worker's gross income. It includes amounts that have been withheld by employers to pay taxes, health insurance or other payments. Therefore, this may be larger than the amount the individual actually takes home as pay.
- Unearned Income: All income that is not earned income. However, some types of unearned income (e.g., SSI retroactive payments, EITC payments, and state relocation assistance) can be excluded.
  - Lump Sums & Court Awards: A lump sum award or a court award, such as from a settlement, are considered unearned income for SSI purposes. Individuals on SSI must report receiving a lump sum or court award to the Social Security Administration by at least 10 days after the month in which the award was received. Any lump sum or court award will reduce the individual's benefit award amount correspondingly in the month received. If the award remains unspent, it will count as resources in the following month, impacting eligibility.
- In-Kind Income: Non-cash items such as: real property (including shelter), food, or non-cash wages (e.g., room and board as compensation for employment).
- Deemed Income: When an eligible individual resides in the same household as his/her ineligible spouse or, if a child, with ineligible parent(s), the income of such spouse or parent is considered in determining the individual's eligibility and payment amount.

=== Payments ===
Payments for SSI are made on the first day of the month unless that day is on a weekend or legal holiday, in which case the payment is made on the first day prior that is not a weekend or legal holiday. The minimum benefit is one dollar.

When benefits start

Social Security determines the first month of potential eligibility for SSI by the date of the intent to file an application for benefits as expressed to the Social Security Administration, and an application is filed within 60 days of the date of that expressed intention. To begin the process, people wishing to be considered must contact Social Security (there is a toll-free telephone number) to set up a disability interview. No online application for SSI is currently available; however, one may apply for Social Security Disability or Retirement benefits online and add the application for SSI via a telephone-scheduled interview. Calls placed on the last day of the month, where the interview is scheduled for the second week of the following month, will result in SSI eligibility being retroactive to the month in which the call was made to set up the appointment, although the first check will not be received until the next month. For example, a person calls on 31 January to set up an appointment for February. January will be the month-of-application for determination purposes, but the first benefit check will be issued in February. Medicaid benefits usually begin the first month in which medical and financial requirements are met.

Eligibility during waiting period

People who have qualified for Social Security disability benefits may receive SSI during the five-month waiting period if they meet the income and resource requirements specified above in the eligibility section.

=== Overpayments, underpayments, and missed benefits ===
The Social Security Administration (SSA) indicates that their "greatest payment accuracy challenges occur within the SSI program." Further, the agency notes administering "the SSI program is complicated by the statutory requirement for us to determine SSI eligibility and calculate SSI payments on a monthly basis." Because payment accuracy is sometimes the result of "program requirements themselves", the agency is seeking ways to simplify the program.

An overpayment occurs when the Social Security Administration pays an individual benefits that they are not eligible for. This may occur if an individual exceeds the income or resource limit for a given month. The overpayment amount is calculated as the difference between the amount that was paid and the amount for which the individual was eligible. To avoid overpayments, individuals should make sure to comply with their reporting responsibilities (e.g., report any new income). Additionally, individuals should be aware of the resource and income thresholds (see above) that determine eligibility. To avoid overpayment, when an individual knows they will surpass a resource or income threshold for a given month, they should proactively report this to the Social Security Administration.

If a beneficiary is not at fault for an overpayment and cannot afford to pay the money back, they can submit a waiver form (SSA-63BK) to prevent overpayment recovery. "Fault" can be the failure to furnish information which the individual knew or should have known was incorrect, making an incorrect statement they knew to be incorrect, or not returning a payment they knew or could have been expected to know was incorrect.

An underpayment occurs when the Social Security Administration pays an individual benefits below the amount they are due. Underpayments in SSI often occur if the agency is unaware of changes in a beneficiary's earnings or living arrangements.

Missed benefits occur when an individual is unaware of eligibility for SSI and does not apply. A randomized control trial by SSA found mailing notices to individuals informing them about the SSI program sharply increased applications and benefit awards. Based on that study, SSA mailed outreach notices to persons potentially eligible for SSI. SSA's Chief Actuary estimated this outreach will lead to an additional $529.5 million in lifetime income from SSI to disabled and aged individuals. The increase in lifetime income is 17 times the administrative cost of conducting the outreach.

Studies have found that "just over 50 percent" of individuals eligible for SSI receive benefits from the program, which can be attributed to lack of awareness, a complex application process, or a desire not to participate in the program.

== Federal living arrangements ==
There are four living arrangements for SSI: A, B, C, and D.

=== Living arrangement A ===
Living arrangement A is for an individual that has rental liability or buys their food separately from the rest of the household.

=== Living arrangement B ===
Living arrangement B is for an individual that has no rental liability and does not buy their food separately. This is the most disadvantageous living arrangement. An individual will have a minimum charge of income deducted from their check. This is done because it is considered that an individual is being given income in the form of free housing and food. An individual in living arrangement B will also be subject to more periodic reviews called redeterminations. This is done because it is common for a person in living arrangement B to eventually obtain rental liability or buy their food separately.

=== Living arrangement C ===
Living arrangement C is for children living with at least one of their parents. In some cases it may be possible that a child has another living arrangement. This happens when the child does not live with either parent.

=== Living arrangement D ===
Living arrangement D is for individuals in facility where Medicaid pays over fifty percent. A person is only due a check of thirty dollars per month. This is because it considered that the individual has all his basic needs met.

== Beneficiaries by age ==
- Age 65 or older – 2,482,524
- Between ages 18–64 – 3,918,514
- Under age 18 – 1,008,130

Total beneficiaries as of May, 2025: 7,409,168

== Beneficiaries and costs ==
Year	Beneficiaries	Costs
1974	3,996,064	$5,096,813,000
1975	4,314,275	$5,716,072,000
1980	4,142,017	$7,714,640,000
1985	4,138,021	$10,749,938,000
1990	4,817,127	$16,132,959,000
1991	5,118,470	$17,95,639,000
1992	5,566,189	$21,682,410,000
1993	5,984,330	$23,991,153,000
1994	6,295,786	$25,291,087,000
1995	6,514,134	$27,037,280,000
1996	6,613,718	$28,252,474,000
1997	6,494,985	$28,370,568,000
1998	6,566,069	$29,408,208,000
1999	6,556,634	$30,106,132,000
2000	6,601,686	$30,671,699,000
2001	6,688,489	$32,165,856,000
2002	6,787,857	$33,718,999,000
2003	6,902,364	$34,693,278,000
2004	6,987,845	$36,065,358,000
2005	7,113,879	$37,235,000,000
2006	7,235,583	$38,889,000,000
2007	7,359,525	$41,205,000,000
2008	7,520,501	$43,040,000,000
2009	7,676,686	$46,592,308,000
2010	7,912,266	$48,194,514,000
2011	8,112,773	$49,520,299,000
2012	8,262,877	$52,074,525,000
2013	8,363,477	$53,899,898,000
2014	8,335,457	$54,693,013,000
2015	8,309,564	$54,966,168,000
2016	8,251,161	$54,799,215,000
2017	8,227,676	$54,516,335,000
2018	8,128,652	$54,847,237,000
2019	8,076,867	$55,852,198,000
2020	7,959,766	$56,285,465,000
2021	7,695,900	$55,537,967,000
2022	7,542,222	$57,561,151,000
2023	7,425,331	$61,384,539,000
2024	7,423,856	$63,079,493,000

== Payee assignment ==
Generally, the person qualifying for benefits is determined to be capable of managing their own financial affairs, and the benefits may be disbursed directly to them. In the case of persons who have a diagnosed mental impairment which interferes with their ability to manage their own finances, the Social Security Administration may require that the person assign someone to be their representative payee. This person will receive the benefits on behalf of the disabled individual, and disburse them directly to payors such as landlords, or to the disabled person, while providing money management assistance (help with purchasing items, limiting spending money, etc.). The representative payee generally does not charge a fee for this service, especially if the payee is a friend or relative. Social service agencies who are assigned as payee are prohibited from charging a fee, though some private payee agencies do provide the service for a small fee. Some states and counties have representative payee agencies (also called substitute payee programs) which receive the benefits on behalf of the disabled person's social worker, and disburse the benefits per the social worker's instructions.

Almost all children eligible for SSI have representative payees (typically a parent or other family member). Among disabled adults receiving SSI, about 34 percent have representative payees. Disabled adults with mental disorders, such as autistic disorders, developmental disorders, and intellectual disabilities, commonly have representative payees. About 10 percent of SSI recipients 65 or older have representative payees.

The Social Security Advisory Board commissioned a study of the Social Security Administration's representative payee program and held a policy forum in 2020 on the topic. The study noted the difficulty SSA field staff face in determining the need for representative payees and finding suitable payees particularly when family members are not available. In addition, the large size of the payee program (6 million payees for Social Security and SSI beneficiaries) combined with limited agency resources makes selection and monitoring of payees challenging for SSA. Among its recommendations, the authors of the study concluded SSA needed additional staff to effectively run the payee program. The authors also suggested SSA pilot a program where some field staff specialized in representative payee workloads.

== Benefits in addition to SSI ==
Once an individual qualifies for Supplemental Security Income they automatically become eligible for several other assistance programs as allowed by Federal and State law. An SSI recipient can receive benefits from all programs listed and they serve as a safety net for those on the program.

- Medicaid In order to help with the purchase of medicine and hospital care for the aged, blind, and disabled.
- Food Stamps (SNAP) for the purchase of food. Depends on the individual's state of residence on how much they may receive in food stamps.
- Housing choice voucher program, more commonly known as HUD Section 8. SSI recipients automatically are entitled to Section 8 Housing as they meet the low income criteria yet they have to be approved by the Department of Housing and Urban Development.
- Ticket to Work All SSI beneficiaries ages 18–64 interested in working are eligible for free employment support services through the Social Security Administration.

In addition, SSI recipients who are eligible for Medicare receive assistance in covering out-of-pocket medical expenses through the Medicare Savings Programs and the Extra Help Program.

== Recent legislative and regulatory proposals ==
The Biden administration proposed legislative changes that would raise the maximum federal benefit under SSI to at least the poverty threshold for the United States (about $1,084 per month in 2020). Under current benefit amounts, about 3.3 million SSI recipients are poor. The administration also proposed increasing the resource limits in SSI by changes in the price level in the United States. Under current resource limits, to qualify for SSI, individuals must have resources below $2,000 and married couples must have resources below $3,000. These limits have been fixed in dollar amounts since 1989. The administration's proposal would have increase these to about $4,300 and $8,600 in 2021 (reflecting price growth since 1989 and setting the couple rate at twice that of an individual). Amounts would be automatically increased for future price growth. The Biden administration further proposed to eliminate benefit reductions due to "in kind" support received by SSI recipients and to set the couple rate under SSI to twice that of the individual rate.

The first Trump administration proposed legislative changes to disregard earnings of disabled students for purposes of calculating SSI benefits, which would allow students to increase earnings without a loss in SSI benefits. The first Trump administration also proposed legislative changes to reduce total SSI benefits in cases where more than one person in the family qualified for SSI. These proposals were not acted upon by Congress.

A regulation implemented by the Trump administration removed the inability to speak English as an educational factor to be considered in SSI and Social Security disability determination. The regulation is projected to "result in a reduction of about 6,500 OASDI [Social Security] beneficiary awards per year and 4,000 SSI recipient awards per year on average over the period FY 2019-28, with a corresponding reduction of $4.6 billion in OASDI benefit payments and $0.8 billion in Federal SSI payments over the same period." The Trump administration argued communicating in English is no longer "a reliable indicator of an individual's educational attainment or the vocational impact of an individual's education." Disability advocates, however, questioned the validity of this argument and provided comments arguing against the regulation.

The first Trump administration proposed a regulation to conduct an additional 1.1 million full disability reviews over the 2020-2029 period of individuals receiving Social Security and SSI disability. The regulation would have terminated Social Security and SSI benefits for a number of individuals and, based on a number of comments in the federal register, was controversial. Trump administration officials argued the rule would encourage labor force reentry among disabled persons. However, organizations expressed concern that many disabled individuals would not have representation when their cases were reviewed and would face onerous administrative challenges that would ultimately prevent them from continuing to receive benefits even though they were still disabled. The proposed regulation was withdrawn by the Biden administration.

In addition, the Trump administration developed a proposal that would have made it more difficult for older workers to qualify for Social Security or SSI disability. The Social Security Act requires SSA to consider a person's education and age when making disability decisions. Officials in the Trump administration argued that older workers in the current economy no longer face the same difficulties as in the past with regard to meeting the occupational requirements of work and therefore tighter standards were necessary. Democratic leaders in the House of Representatives strongly opposed the proposal, arguing the disability requirements were already strict and the regulation would prevent severely disabled individuals from receiving benefits. Leaked documents to the press indicated that as many as 500,000 individuals would not receive Social Security or SSI if the regulation was implemented. The Biden administration withdrew consideration of the regulation.

Recent legislative proposals in Congress have included proposed changes to child benefits, eligibility requirements, and benefit amounts.

The School Attendance Improves Lives (SAIL) Act in 2015 proposed reducing SSI benefits for children ages 16–17 if they were not attending school. The goal of the legislation was to increase school attendance among SSI recipients, although the legislation was criticized by some as being unnecessary. The legislation was not enacted.

Some members of the House and Senate, including the Chairman of the Senate Finance Committee Ron Wyden, requested the Biden administration include legislative proposals to increase SSI benefits to the poverty level and to adjust resource limits under SSI as part of the administration's "American Families Plan."

== Improving outcomes for disabled youth ==
Disabled youth transitioning to adulthood have been a focus of policymakers. Upon turning 18, a child's disability is re-evaluated using SSA's definition of disability for adults. In about one-third of the cases, SSI benefits are terminated. Policymakers have been concerned that these youth, who have a history of health problems, are unprepared to support themselves in adulthood. As a result, Congress has created special provisions in the law and funded large-scale research studies to test ways to improve outcomes for youth on SSI. In addition, federal agencies have made some attempts to improve outcomes through better practices.

A special provision of the Social Security Act, called Section 301, allows disabled youth to retain benefits at age 18 so long as they are working in an approved program to prepare for employment in adulthood. For example, youth participating in programs run by state Vocational Rehabilitation agencies may continue to receive benefits even if they do not meet the adult disability definition. Because many families are unaware of the protections under Section 301, SSA began mailing information to families with disabled youth to inform them of this provision and provide other information to help youth successfully transition to adulthood.

Congress has funded two large-scale studies to test ways to improve outcomes among disabled youth on SSI. The Youth Transition Demonstration (YTD) tested service and other interventions in several states. Findings from the demonstration were mixed, with some interventions improving outcomes (employment, lower contact with the juvenile justice system) and some interventions not having statistically significant effects. YTD was followed by the Promoting Readiness in Minors in SSI (PROMISE) demonstration. Interim impact results found positive employment and other outcomes from "case management, employment-promoting services, benefits counseling, financial education, and parent training and information about youth’s disability."

== See also ==
- ADA Amendments Act of 2008
- Americans with Disabilities Act of 1990
- Court cases:
  - Flemming v. Nestor
  - Goldberg v. Kelly
  - Helvering v. Davis
  - Richardson v. Perales
  - Steward Machine Company v. Davis
  - Sullivan v. Zebley
- Disability Determination Services
- Disability fraud
- Income Support, a similar program operated in the United Kingdom
- Michael J. Astrue
- Mixed economy
- Office of the Chief Actuary
- Rehabilitation Act of 1973
- Social safety net
- Social Security (United States)
- Social Security debate (United States)
- Social Security Disability Insurance
- Social Security number
- Ticket to Work
- United States Department of the Treasury
- United States welfare state
- Welfare
- Welfare economics
- Welfare fraud
- Welfare state
