= Adult Protective Services =

American social service for adults in trouble

In the United States, Adult Protective Services (APS) is a government agency that investigates allegations of a vulnerable adult being or having been abused, neglected, or exploited by their caregivers. APS is typically administered by local or state health, aging, or regulatory departments and includes a multidisciplinary approach to helping older adults, and younger adults with disabilities, who are victims. Services range from the initial investigation of mistreatment, to health and supportive services and legal interventions, up to and including the appointment of surrogate decision-makers such as legal guardians.

While some states provide adult protective services to older adults only, as in Ohio where the APS law applies to those 60 and older, most serve adults with disabilities over the age of 18 who meet the state's definition of "vulnerable". Disabilities may be due to aging, developmental disabilities, physical disabilities, mental illness or cognitive impairments.

Forms of abuse include physical, emotional, verbal, and sexual abuse as well as financial exploitation. "Neglect" can be perpetrated by any caregiver who has accepted the responsibility of assisting an older person or an adult with disabilities.

Most states include self-neglect in their definitions of those needing adult protective services. Self-neglect refers to a person who is unable to care for themselves due to physical or cognitive impairments.

== See also ==
- Vulnerable adult
- Safeguarding
