= Social Security Disability Insurance =

US federal insurance program for income to disabled workers

Benefit Calculation & Architecture
Core Program Metrics (2026)
- Max Monthly Benefit: $4,152.00
- Avg Monthly Benefit: $1,634.70
- Funding Source: FICA Tax (6.2% employer / 6.2% employee)

The 3-Step Calculation Formula
- Step 1: Indexing History: Up to 35 highest-earning years are adjusted using the National Average Wage Index (AWI) to account for lifetime inflation.
- Step 2: Monthly Baseline: Total adjusted earnings are divided by the total months in those active years to yield the Average Indexed Monthly Earnings (AIME).
- Step 3: Progressive Scaling: The AIME is passed through a three-tiered progressive formula to generate the final Primary Insurance Amount (PIA).

2026 PIA Formula & Bend Points
- The formula calculates 100% of the baseline payout via two structural income thresholds: • Tier 1: 90% of first $1,286 of AIME  • Tier 2: 32% of AIME from $1,287 to $7,749  • Tier 3: 15% of AIME exceeding $7,749

Adjustments & Offsets
- Early/Late Penalties: None. Unlike retirement benefits, SSDI pays 100% of the calculated PIA immediately regardless of age.
- Workers' Comp Offset: Combined SSDI and Workers' Comp benefits cannot exceed 80% of the worker's pre-disability average current earnings.
- Official Calculator: SSA AnyPIA Portal

Social Security Disability Insurance (SSDI) is a payroll tax–funded federal insurance program of the United States government. It is managed by the Social Security Administration and is designed to provide monthly benefits to people with a medically determinable disability (physical or mental) that restricts their ability to be employed. SSDI does not provide partial or temporary benefits but rather pays only full benefits, and they are only paid in cases in which the disability is "expected to last at least one year or result in death". Relative to disability programs in other countries in the Organisation for Economic Co-operation and Development (OECD), the SSDI program in the United States has strict requirements regarding eligibility.

SSDI is distinct from Supplemental Security Income (SSI). Unlike SSDI (as well as Social Security retirement benefits), where payment is based on contribution credits earned through previous work and therefore treated as an insurance benefit without reference to other income or assets, SSI is a means-tested program in the United States for disabled children, disabled adults, and older people who have income and resources below administratively mandated thresholds. A person of any income level found disabled by the SSA (a finding based on legal and medical justification) can receive SSDI. ('Disability' under SSDI is measured by a different standard than under the Americans with Disabilities Act.)

Informal names for SSDI include Disability Insurance Benefits (DIB) and Title II disability benefits. These names come from the chapter title of the governing section of the Social Security Act. The original Social Security Act of 1935 did not include disability insurance. After two decades of policy discussion, disability benefits were introduced through the Social Security Amendments of 1956, which were signed into law by President Dwight D. Eisenhower on August 1, 1956. These amendments authorized monthly payments for permanently and totally disabled workers over 50 years old beginning in July 1957. Beginning in 1960, eligibility for disabled workers was extended to individuals of any age.

== Beneficiaries ==
=== Number and trends ===
At the end of 2020, 9.7 million Americans were receiving benefits from the SSDI program, including 8.2 million disabled workers, 1.4 million children of disabled workers, and 0.1 million spouses of disabled workers. Children and spouses are sometimes called "auxiliary beneficiaries" because they receive benefits based on their relationship to a disabled worker, not because they are disabled.

The number of beneficiaries grew rapidly between 1990 and 2010 before leveling off and then declining. Two schools of thought developed to explain the rapid growth in the program during the 1990s and early 2000s. According to David Autor and Mark Duggan, policy changes and earnings patterns were responsible for the growth. With regard to policy, Autor and Duggan argue an SSDI reform act loosened the disability screening process, leading to more SSDI awards and shifting their composition toward claimants with low-mortality disorders such as mental illness and back pain. With regard to earnings patterns, Autor and Duggan argue SSDI benefits rose in value relative to what recipients would have earned from employment, prompting more people to seek benefits. The second school of thought on program growth in the 1990s and early 2000s emphasizes demographic factors such as population growth, the aging of Baby boomers into their disability-prone years, growth in women's labor force participation, and the increase in Social Security's full retirement age from 65 to 66.

The number of disabled workers peaked in 2014 at 9.0 million and has declined since, reaching 8.2 million in 2020.

Concerns about the Disability Insurance (DI) Trust Fund's solvency arose from rapid program growth in the 1990s and early 2000s. In response, Congress temporarily reallocated a portion of payroll taxes from the Old-Age and Survivors Insurance (OASI) Trust Fund to the DI Trust Fund. A 2020 report projected depletion in 2065, followed by a 2021 analysis projecting depletion in 2057. But the 2024 analysis projects the DI Trust Fund will be able to pay full benefits through the end of the 75-year projection period (2098).

In addition to disabled workers, the Social Security program also pays benefits to disabled widow(er)s and disabled adult children (DAC). These beneficiaries are often analyzed along with disabled workers because the same definition of disability is used in the eligibility process. But disabled widow(er) benefits are paid out of the Old-Age and Survivors Insurance (OASI) Trust Fund and disabled adult children may be paid out of the OASI or DI Trust Fund, depending on whether the adult child qualifies because a parent is deceased or retired or whether a parent is disabled. In 2019, 1.14 million disabled adult children and 0.25 million disabled widow(er)s received benefits.

During the second Trump Administration, the Social Security Administration underwent significant internal changes, including the loss of roughly 13% of its staff and an effort to move many services online Researchers found that these changes made the process of claiming SSDI benefits significantly more difficult.

=== Characteristics ===
Social Security disability beneficiaries have high poverty rates relative to other Social Security beneficiaries. About 24% of disabled workers have family income below the official poverty level in the US, compared to 7.1% of retired workers (the largest group of Social Security beneficiaries). About 31% of disabled widow(er) beneficiaries and 36% of disabled adult children are poor. In total, 2.4 million disabled worker, widow(er), and adult child beneficiaries are poor. About 38% of Social Security disability beneficiaries experience material hardship, defined as having low or very low food security or an inability to pay utility bills or housing costs.

About 72% of Social Security disabled workers are between the ages of 50 and 66 and about 28% are under 50 (at Social Security's "full retirement age" (currently 66), SSA reclassifies disabled workers as retired workers). 24% of disabled workers are African American.

As expected from a program restricted to persons with severe disabilities, Social Security disability beneficiaries have very high rates of health problems, hospitalization, and medical visits relative to the general US working-age population.

The work capacity of Social Security disability beneficiaries has been the subject of several studies and policy debates. Some have argued that, despite their impairments, many disabled beneficiaries could return to work. Others have argued that the work capacity of Social Security disability beneficiaries is very limited due to the prevalence of severe health problems.

=== Monthly benefit amounts ===
In 2024, the average monthly benefit paid to disabled workers was about $1,581. About 17% of disabled workers received a monthly benefit under $1,000.

The monthly benefit a disabled worker receives depends on the person's earnings in Social Security-covered employment before becoming disabled. For each disabled worker, a Primary Insurance Amount (PIA) is computed that depends on the worker's past earnings, wage growth in the economy before the worker's disability onset, and a benefit formula that gives low earners greater weight. The disabled worker receives a benefit equal to the PIA. An eligible spouse or child may receive 50% of the PIA as a benefit, but total payments to a family are capped.

Monthly benefits in the Social Security program have three general features. They replace a larger share of past earnings for low earners, and they increase with inflation. Initial benefits are computed using wage indexing, which allows initial benefits to reflect wage growth in the economy during the worker's career.

Monthly benefit amounts for disabled adult children depend on the earnings in Social Security-covered employment of the retired, disabled, or deceased parent and amounts for disabled widow(er)s depend on the earnings of the deceased spouse.

== Application, initial determination, and appeals ==
=== Application ===
To receive SSDI, a person must file an application with the Social Security Administration (SSA). People can apply for SSDI by:

- Calling SSA's national toll-free number (1-800-772-1213),
- Contacting a local Social Security office,
- Submitting an online application.

SSA will determine whether the applicant is "insured" for SSDI benefits. Generally, this depends on whether the applicant has worked "long enough—and recently enough—and paid Social Security taxes" on earnings. Disabled widow(er)s or disabled adult children need not be insured based on the individual's own employment history; in those cases, the deceased spouse or the parent of the disabled adult child must have worked in Social Security employment and achieved the required insured status.

SSA will also determine whether the applicant is performing substantial gainful activity, which means earning above certain levels. If the applicant is performing substantial gainful activity, then their application for disability is denied.

If the applicant is found to be insured for Social Security benefits and not performing substantial gainful activity, SSA will send the application to the Disability Determination Service (DDS) agency in the applicant's state. The state DDS, which is under contract with SSA, will determine whether the applicant is disabled. The state DDS must follow the federal definition of disability under the Social Security Act when making this determination.

=== Initial determination ===
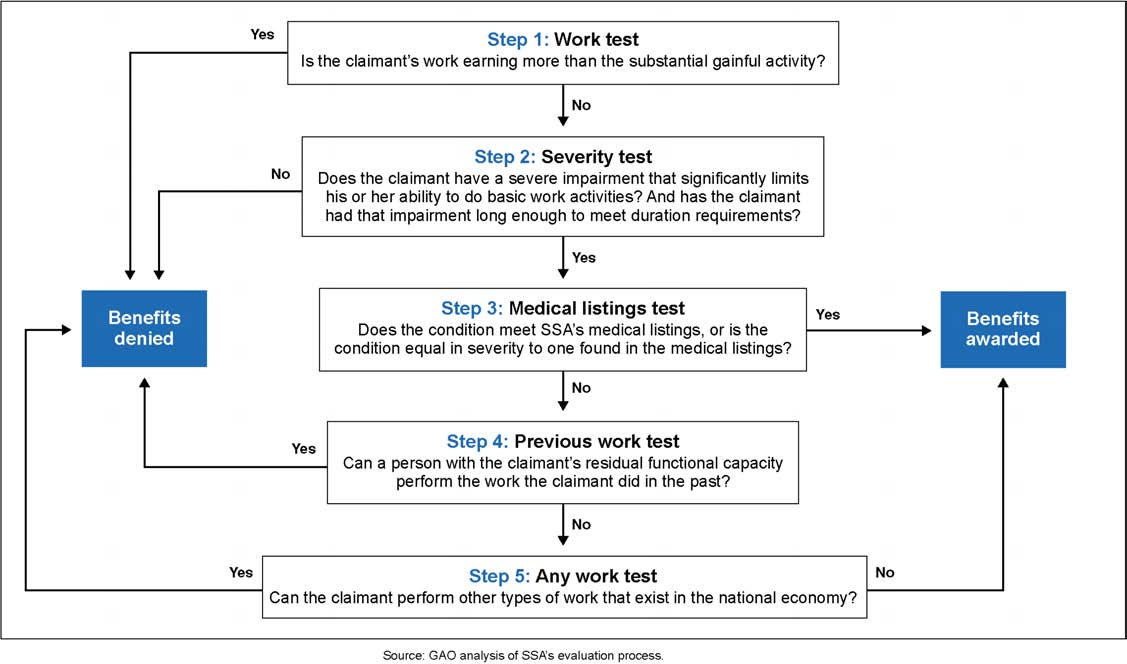
SSA's Five-Step Sequential Evaluation Process for Determining Disability

The determination of a disability claim is based on a five-step sequential evaluation process, which examines medical and other evidence. For adults, the sequence is:

1. Is the applicant performing substantial gainful activity? If yes, deny. If no, continue.
2. Is the applicant's impairment severe? If no, deny. If yes, continue.
3. Does the impairment meet or equal the severity of impairments in the Listing of Impairments? If yes, allow the claim. If no, continue.
4. Is the applicant able to perform past work? If yes, deny. If no, continue.
5. Is the applicant able to perform any work in the economy? If yes, deny. If no, allow the claim.

Medical evidence demonstrating the applicant's inability to work is required. If the DDS lacks sufficient medical evidence to decide a claim, it may schedule a consultative examination (CE). A third‑party physician or psychologist, paid by DDS, will examine the applicant and produce medical documentation to supplement records the applicant's treating sources did not provide. The applicant may meet an SSA medical listing for their condition (step 3 of the sequential evaluation) and be awarded benefits. If their condition does not meet the requirements of a listing, their residual functional capacity (RFC) is considered, along with their age, past relevant work, and education, in determining their ability to perform either their past work or other work generally available in the national economy. The RFC is an assessment of a person's work capacity given their impairments.

Determination of RFC—made in step 4 of the sequential evaluation process—often constitutes the bulk of the SSDI application and appeal process. An RFC is assessed in accordance with Title 20 of the Code of Federal Regulations, part 404, section 1545, and is generally based on the opinions of treating and examining physicians, if available.

RFC is classified according to the five exertional levels of work defined in the Dictionary of Occupational Titles: sedentary, light, medium, heavy, and very heavy. For example, an applicant's RFC may indicate that they can perform at most medium work, given their impairments. If their RFC equals or exceeds the job requirements of their previous work, the claim is denied on the basis that they can return to former work. If their RFC is less than the requirements of former work, then the RFC is applied against a vocational grid that considers their age, education, and the transferability of their learned and used skills. The vocational grid then guides whether benefits should be allowed.

=== Appeals ===
In fiscal year 2020, state DDSs denied 61% of initial claims. SSA provides for three levels of administrative appeal if a state DDS initially denies an application. At the first level, the applicant may request reconsideration of the initial decision. In the reconsideration, a different DDS examiner will review the case. If the claim is denied at this stage, the applicant can request a hearing before an Administrative Law Judge (ALJ). ALJs are not state employees but federal employees of the SSA. If the claim is denied at this stage, the applicant can request a review of the case by the Appeals Council of the SSA. Administrative appeals are non-adversarial and the applicant may submit new evidence.

After an applicant has exhausted the administrative appeals process, they may appeal to the federal courts. Federal court findings may pertain to the individual case, but may also result in required changes in SSA's policies and procedures if the court concludes those policies and procedures do not conform to federal law or the U.S. Constitution.

== Legal representation ==
Applicants may hire a lawyer or non-attorney representative to help them apply or appeal. There are two primary types of organizations: companies with trained specialists experienced in handling SSDI applications and appeals in some or any local community, and law firms that specialize in disability-related cases.

An August 2010 report by the SSA's Inspector General Office found that a claimant representation was "infrequent" at the Disability Determination Service level, while "a majority" who appealed their cases were represented at the hearing level. The same report said that many people submitting an application for SSDI (as well as SSI) might benefit from using a third-party disability representative when they first apply for benefits. It said that having a disability representative earlier in the process significantly improves the chance that people with four major types of disabilities will be approved for SSDI.

The fee a representative may charge for SSDI representation is set by law and is limited to 25% of the retroactive SSDI benefits awarded. While some representatives may charge fees for costs related to the claim, such as photocopy and medical record collection expenses, the vast majority of disability attorneys and representatives do not charge a fee unless they win the case. Until 1991, SSA regulations required attorneys and representatives to submit a "Fee Petition" itemizing time spent on the matter. The SSDI applicant could agree or object to the fee requested, and the social security decision-maker often approved less than the full fee amount requested by the attorney/representative.

In 1991, SSA implemented the "fee agreement" process. If the attorney/representative contract limited the fee to no more than $4,000, a detailed review and approval of time spent on the case via the "Fee Petition" process was no longer required. Social security regulations require that the fee agreement conform to specific standards. This attorney fee cap for the "fee agreement" process increased to $6,000 effective June 22, 2009. Because of the reduced administrative burden afforded by the "fee agreement" process, and the time delay for approving and disbursing fees under the "fee petition" process, most disability lawyers and representative primarily use the "fee agreement" process.

If an SSDI applicant is approved quickly and does not receive a retroactive award, the SSA must review and approve the fee a representative will charge the applicant. Disability representatives do not charge a fee if they are unsuccessful in obtaining a claimant's disability benefit.

Representatives may decline to represent an applicant if, after reviewing the situation, they do not believe the applicant is likely to meet the requirements for SSDI. Most representatives provide this screening at no cost. Typical reasons people do not meet the requirements are that the representative feels the disability is not severe enough or the applicant does not have a sufficient work history and did not pay enough into the Federal Insurance Contributions Act (FICA).

== Wait time for decisions and hearings ==
The time it takes for an application to be approved or denied varies depending on whether it is an initial decision or an appeal. In fiscal year 2019, it took an average of 120 days for SSA to make an initial determination on a disability claim. The figure increased after the COVID-19 pandemic and, for months in fiscal year 2021, the average wait time for an initial decision was 165 days.

The high number of cases and long wait times for a hearing before an administrative law judge drew significant attention from Congress, which provided additional funding for the workload. The number of cases and wait times then declined. In fiscal year 2020, the average wait time for a hearing was 386 days (down from 605 days in fiscal year 2017).

For some cases, SSA will expedite disability determinations. These include Quick Disability Determination (QDD) and Compassionate Allowance cases. These are cases where statistical models or medical diagnoses indicate the person has an extremely severe medical condition. These cases can often be processed in under 30 days. Cases involving military veterans are also often expedited.

Congressional concern over wait times focused, to some extent, on the number of people who die or become bankrupt while waiting for a disability determination. The Government Accountability Office (GAO) found that from fiscal year 2014 through fiscal year 2019, about 48,000 people filed for bankruptcy while awaiting a decision on their disability appeal and, for fiscal year 2008 through fiscal year 2019, about 110,000 people died before receiving a decision.

== Likelihood of receiving benefits ==
Considering all levels of adjudication, about 4 in 10 SSDI applicants are awarded benefits. Slightly more than 50% of applicants who meet technical requirements of eligibility are determined to be medically eligible.

The number of cases and percentage allowed at each stage of adjudication for all types of disability cases in fiscal year 2020 are as follows:

| Level | Number of Cases | Percent allowed |
|---|---|---|
| Initial Determinations | 1,967,753 | 39 |
| Reconsiderations | 540,133 | 14 |
| Administrative Law Judge Hearing | 403,108 | 49 |
| Appeals Council | 126,731 | 1 |
| Federal Court | 16,852 | 2 |

== Denied applicants ==
One study found that 12.4 million Americans, about 6.2% of the US population aged 18 to 66, are denied SSDI benefits. The study also found these applicants had high rates of health problems and of hospitalization compared to the general population. About 52% of denied applicants reported difficulty standing for one hour, compared to about 5% of the general population. About 21% of denied applicants were hospitalized during the year, compared to about 6% of the general population. Denied applicants had a high poverty rate (38%) and a high rate of material hardship (43%). Material hardship was defined as low or very low food security or an inability to pay utility or housing costs.

A baseline study of denied SSDI and SSI applicants who sought benefits on the basis of mental impairments found denied applicants had low income and "multiple mental health and general medical conditions, low quality of life, and low functional ability". The baseline population is people who are part of the SSA's Supported Employment Demonstration. The goal of the demonstration is to test whether employment support and health interventions can improve outcomes for denied applicants.

== Payee assignment ==
Generally, a person qualifying for benefits is determined to be capable of managing their own financial affairs, and the benefits are disbursed directly to them. In the case of persons who have a diagnosed mental impairment that interferes with their ability to manage their finances, SSA may require that the person assign someone to be their representative payee. The payee receives the benefits on the disabled person's behalf and disburses them directly to payers such as landlords or to the disabled person, while providing money management assistance (help with purchasing items, limiting spending money, etc.). The payee often does not charge for this service, especially if they are a friend or relative. Social service agencies who are assigned as payees may charge a fee, but SSA sets a maximum amount. The fee is the same for all recipients, but may be larger for those with severe substance abuse problems (SSA, not the payee, determines when a higher fee can be charged). Some states and counties have representative payee agencies (also called substitute payee programs) that receive the benefits on behalf of the disabled person's social worker and disburse the benefits per the social worker's instructions. A payee can be very helpful to unhoused people who need assistance paying down debts (like utility bills) and saving for housing.

About 10% of disabled worker beneficiaries have representative payees and about 5% of disabled widow(er)s do. About 73% of disabled adult children have representative payees.

== Regulatory changes ==
The "treating physician rule" gave "controlling weight" to determinations of the treating physicians. SSA established this rule in 1991 under the influence of federal courts and a law passed by Congress after SSA was scrutinized in the 1980s for relying largely on its own medical examiners. Before that, federal courts had imposed a similar rule through a common law, but it was inconsistent.

On January 18, 2017, SSA published final rules titled "Revisions to Rules Regarding the Evaluation of Medical Evidence" regarding the "treating physician rule". These rules apply to cases filed after March 27, 2017. They expand the definition of what SSA considers an "acceptable medical source" for disability claim medical opinions to include nurse practitioners, physician assistants, and others, and have effectively abolished the "treating physician rule" by eliminating the requirement that a treating physician opinion be granted "controlling weight".

In 2020, SSA implemented a regulation that removed inability to speak English as a factor to be considered in SSI and SSDI determination. This is projected to "result in a reduction of about 6,500 OASDI [Social Security] beneficiary awards per year and 4,000 SSI recipient awards per year on average over the period FY 2019–28, with a corresponding reduction of $4.6 billion in OASDI benefit payments and $0.8 billion in Federal SSI payments over the same period." SSA argued communicating in English is no longer "a reliable indicator of an individual's educational attainment or the vocational impact of an individual's education". Disability advocates have questioned this and spoken against the regulation.

== Related programs ==
Regardless of a person's age, after receiving SSDI benefits for 24 months, they are eligible for Medicare, including Part A (hospital benefits), Part B (medical benefits), and Part D (drug benefits). The date of Medicare eligibility is measured from the date of eligibility for SSDI (generally six months after the start of disability), not the date when the first SSDI payment was received.

People receiving SSDI may qualify for Supplemental Security Income if they have limited income and resources. For example, a disabled person who worked in Social Security-covered employment and who has limited income and resources may receive an SSDI benefit (due to employment before disability) and a partial SSI benefit (due to limited income and resources). SSA, which administers both SSDI and SSI, uses the same definition of disability for adults in each program.

The Department of Veterans Affairs (VA) uses a different definition of disability, but people may qualify for benefits under each program depending on the severity of the disability. While SSA does not use VA disability ratings, it examines VA medical records as part of applicants' medical information. In addition, people rated 100% disabled by the VA receive fast-track review of their cases if they apply for SSDI.

The Ticket to Work program is administered by SSA and provides free employment support services to SSDI recipients seeking to return to the workforce.

Some people have disability insurance coverage through an employer or the private insurance markets. Five states (California, New York, New Jersey, Rhode Island, and Hawaii) have programs that provide temporary disability benefits.

== Impact ==
According to a 2021 study that used variation induced by an age-based eligibility rule as a way to draw causal inferences, SSDI substantially reduced disabled people's financial distress. The study finds that SSDI "reduces the likelihood of bankruptcy by 20 percent, foreclosure by 33 percent, and home sale by 15 percent."

Little is known about SSDI's health benefits. A 2024 study that exploited the random assignment of administrative law judges to cases found that benefit allowance increases mortality for people on the margin of being allowed versus denied benefits, but also finds evidence that benefits reduce mortality for less healthy beneficiaries and those with expensive health conditions such as cancer.
