= Disability fraud =

Illegal receipt of disability payments

Disability fraud is the receipt of payment(s) intended for disabled people from a government agency or private insurance company by one who should not be receiving them, or the receipt of a higher amount than one is entitled to. There are various acts that may constitute disability fraud.

Disability fraud can be harder to detect than other forms of fraud, as the majority of people receiving disability payments (at least 90%) do not use a wheelchair or walker, or uses a wheelchair but is able to walk limited distances sometimes, while at the same time, many people who need wheelchairs would not qualify for disability payments. Since most disabilities are "silent" (meaning that they cannot be seen by others), it is not easy to visually determine if a person receiving disability is not disabled.

Disability fraud can result in denial of future benefits as well as criminal prosecution.

== Types of fraud ==
=== In the US ===
The US Social Security Administration outlines fraud for all benefits, not only disability benefits. Fraud includes bribing or impersonating employees, making false claims on statements, working or filing under someone else's Social Security number, misusing benefits, concealing facts or events that affect eligibility for benefits, and failing to notify the agency of the death of a beneficiary and continuing to receive benefits. Individuals can report fraud by contacting the Office of the Inspector General.

Disability benefits fraud is not only committed by applicants. Social Security Administrators can commit fraud when the collude to provide disability benefits to particular individuals, including employees. Individuals might also commit disability benefits fraud by stealing benefits payments from individuals, pretending to be employees, or stealing personal information.

== Challenges to determining disability ==
The US Social Security Administration Office of the Inspector General cites two ongoing administrative issues with disability benefits: difficulty in determining disability and the program cost. In the early years of the program, individuals qualified due to medical conditions on the List of Impairments. Since that time, medical science and treatment have improved to the point where one cannot presume work disability for impairments that traditionally would have resulted in work disability. There has also been a rise in claims involving mental impairments or combinations of mental and physical impairments, which are more complex and difficult to adjudicate.

== Disability benefits fraud prevention ==
=== In the US ===
==== Fraud detection during application process ====
In 2014, the Office of the Inspector General of the SSA produced a report on fraud detection in response to disability benefits fraud by current and former New York City police officers and firefighters. The report found fraud risks at the initial application stage, including lacking front-end fraud identification and prevention and lack of tracking of data on claimant representatives. In response to the report, the SSA began using predictive analytics to detect fraud, established Fraud Prevention Units (FPU), and additional tracking. In the appeals process, some judges may be more likely to approve disability cases and the report recommended increased oversight of Administrative Law Judges.

The SSA has a Cooperative Disability Investigations Unit. in 2024, the CDI reported over $80 million in projected savings to SSA's disability programs. Since its inception in 1997, the CDI contributed to a projected savings of $8.2 billion in taxpayer money and $4.6 billion to the SSA's Title II and Title XVI disability programs.

According to the SSA, young workers have a one in three chance of becoming disabled before retirement age. In 2022, about one-third of disability applications were approved. Denials were mostly due to applicants not meeting the SSA's "technical" requirements, such as not working long or recently enough or not being covered by Social Security. For those who met the initial requirements, just over 50% were approved.

==== Reviews for continued eligibility ====
All disability benefits recipients receive Continuing Disability Reviews (CDR). The frequency depends on the medical condition. If medical improvement is expected, a review will occur within six to 18 months. If improvement is possible, reviews normally occur every three years. If improvement is not expected, reviews happen every seven years. The Office of the Inspector General described these CDRs as a highly effect guard against improper payments and disability program fraud.

CDRs have high return rates of $9 in savings for every dollar invested. When funding is reduced, fewer reviews are conducted.

There have also been calls for the SSA to monitor social media of recipients to detect fraud. The first Trump Administration discussed monitoring social media.

==== Reagan Administration ====
In 1980, Congress passed the Social Security Disability Amendments of 1980 under the Carter administration. When Ronald Reagan entered office, his administration began to review disability benefits recipients. Federal officials suggested that one in five people may be ineligible for benefits. The administration originally estimated a total savings of $10 million from 1982 to 1984 before increasing estimates to $200 million in 1982 and $900 million by 1985. The Reagan Administrations move to disenroll disability benefits recipients was critiqued by the American Psychiatric Association, regional and state Commissioners of Social Security, and even paid consultants for the Social Security Administration.

In March 1981, more than 485,000 recipients received notices saying their benefits would be cut off due to ineligibility. By May 1982, more than 106,000 families had lost disability insurance benefits. Individuals with mental disorders were highly likely to have lost benefits. Several people committed suicide after being told they were losing benefits.

On April 14, 1984, the Reagan Administration suspended efforts to cut disability benefits. Benefits were continued or restored for 40,000 people.

In 1989, the General Accounting Office released a report stating that 63% of individuals who lost benefits from 1981 to 1984 won them back by June 1987. In 1992, federal officials reopened tens of thousands of cases allowing people who could prove they were wrongly denied to receive lump sums for up to four and a half years worth of missed payments.

==== Indiana-IBM welfare privatization ====
In December 2006, Indiana Governor Mitch Daniels signed a $1.1 billion contract with IBM to privatize the state's food stamps, Medicaid, and other assistance programs, include disability benefits, based on guidance from Family and Social Services Administration (FSSA) Secretary Mitch Roob. Daniels claimed the deal would improve client services, reduce waste, and address fraud and errors. Two-thirds of Indiana's social-service staffers became employees of IBM and its partners.

Recipients were no longer able to visit FSSA office to speak with caseworkers, instead they were directed to use the phone or internet. Caseworkers experienced technical difficulties, errors that slowed work, and poor support from IBM. Deaf and blind applicants had difficulty accessing the system due the rigidity of the system and private workers unfamiliar with assistive technology. Rural applicants had difficulty accessing the internet. Automated counties lagged behind counties using the old system in almost every performance area.

Facing severe backlash from advocacy groups and local Democrats and Republicans, Daniels canceled the 10-year deal with IBM in 2009.

In her study of the privatization of welfare services in Indiana, Virginia Eubanks argues that fears of collaboration between caseworkers and applicants to commit fraud was a guiding reason for implementing the changes. One goal of the system was to sever ties between caseworkers and applicants through automation.

The program resulted in a number of lawsuits, including between the state of Indiana and IBM. The ACLU filed a class action lawsuit arguing that the automated nature of the system infringed on recipients due process rights. After several appeals, the Indiana Supreme Court found the states "failure to cooperate" notices under the new system unconstitutional, but ultimately sided with the state. In May 2010, Indiana sued IBM for $437 million and IBM countersued for $100 million. Marion Superior Court Judge David Dreyer found in favor of IBM ruling the state owed the company $12 million, but described it as a "'perfect storm' of misguided government policy and overzealous corporate ambition." In March 2016, the Indiana Supreme Court ruled that IBM did materially breach the contract. In 2019, the Indiana Court of Appeals ruled that IBM owed Indiana $78 million in damages.

== Prevalence of errors in disability benefits ==
Errors in disability benefits can consist of benefits being granted to nondisabled people and to disabled people being rejected for benefits.

=== In the US ===
A 2004 working paper found an error rate of 20% for false positives and 60% for false negatives for awarding disability benefits. A 2012 report from the United States Government Accountability Office found an error fate of 0.6%. The listed error causes were computation errors, eligibility errors, non-verification of earnings, and incorrect processing of payments. A 2019 working paper found that work-disabled women are 12.8% more likely to be denied benefits than work-disabled men.

== Notable cases ==
=== In the US ===
- In 2006, a Massachusetts man was convicted of receiving more than $55,000 in disability payments while continuing to work at his bar. Antonios Sarantos, then 43, of Plymouth, Massachusetts, purchased and opened the T.J. Gupeez bar in Taunton, then purportedly injured his back working at the prison, several weeks later. Undercover officers reported witnessing Sarantos working in the bar, even as he contended he was too injured to return to prison work.
- In 2009, an Idaho man pleaded guilty to $1.5 million in disability fraud, the largest such case in the history of the Veterans Affairs Department.
- In October 2011, a woman and three accomplices were arrested for, among other serious criminal allegations, collecting SSI benefits from four, and possibly more, mentally disabled adults, as their representative payee, and not using the money towards their well-being. The Philadelphia basement kidnapping event is under investigation by the FBI and Philadelphia law enforcement.
- In 2014, 106 people, including retired NYPD officers and FDNY firefighters, received a large disability pension of $400 million due to the aftereffect of the September 11 attacks, but the person involved was indicted after it was found to be false. At that time, the scam was known as the largest pension scam in the United States.

=== In the UK ===
- In 2007, a UK woman was convicted of more than £11,000 in disability fraud after she claimed she could walk only four meters in five minutes, but continued to work at a job she previously held sweeping horse stables.

== See also ==
- Anosognosia for when the opposite happens and a person with a disability denies or is unaware that they have one.
- Criticisms of welfare
- Benefit fraud
- Welfare fraud
