= Social Security Act =

1935 U.S. law creating the Social Security program and unemployment insurance

Social Security Act of 1935
- Other short titles: Social Security Act
- Long title: An Act to provide for the general welfare by establishing a system of Federal old-age benefits, and by enabling the several States to make more adequate provision for aged persons, dependent and crippled children, maternal and child welfare, public health, and the administration of their unemployment laws; to establish a Social Security Board; to raise revenue; and for other purposes.
- Nicknames: SSA
- Enacted by: the 74th United States Congress

Citations
- Statutes at Large: Pub. L. 74–271, 49 Stat. 620, enacted August 14, 1935

Codification
- Titles amended: 42 U.S.C.: Public Health and Social Welfare
- U.S.C. sections created: 42 U.S.C. ch. 7

Legislative history
- Introduced in the House as H.R. 7260 by Robert L. Doughton (D–NC) on April 4, 1935; Committee consideration by House Ways and Means; Passed the House on April 19, 1935 (372–33); Passed the Senate on June 19, 1935 (77–6); Signed into law by President Franklin D. Roosevelt on August 14, 1935

Major amendments
- Social Security Amendments of 1965; Medicare, Medicaid, and SCHIP Balanced Budget Refinement Act of 1999; Social Security Fairness Act

United States Supreme Court cases
- Steward Machine Co. v. Davis; Helvering v. Davis

The Social Security Act of 1935 is a law enacted by the 74th United States Congress and signed into law by U.S. president Franklin D. Roosevelt on August 14, 1935. The law created the Social Security program as well as insurance against unemployment. The law was part of Roosevelt's New Deal domestic program.

By 1930, the United States was one of the few industrialized countries without any national social security system. Amid the Great Depression, the physician Francis Townsend galvanized support behind a proposal to issue direct payments to older people. Responding to that movement, Roosevelt organized a committee led by Secretary of Labor Frances Perkins to develop a major social welfare program proposal. Roosevelt presented the plan in early 1935 and signed the Social Security Act into law on August 14, 1935. The Supreme Court upheld the act in two major cases decided in 1937.

The law established the Social Security program. The old-age program is offset by payroll taxes, and over the ensuing decades, it contributed to a dramatic decline in poverty among older people, and spending on Social Security became a significant part of the federal budget. The Social Security Act also established an unemployment insurance program administered by the states and the Aid to Dependent Children program, which provided aid to families headed by single mothers. The law was later amended by acts such as the Social Security Amendments of 1965, which established two major healthcare programs: Medicare and Medicaid.

== Background and history ==
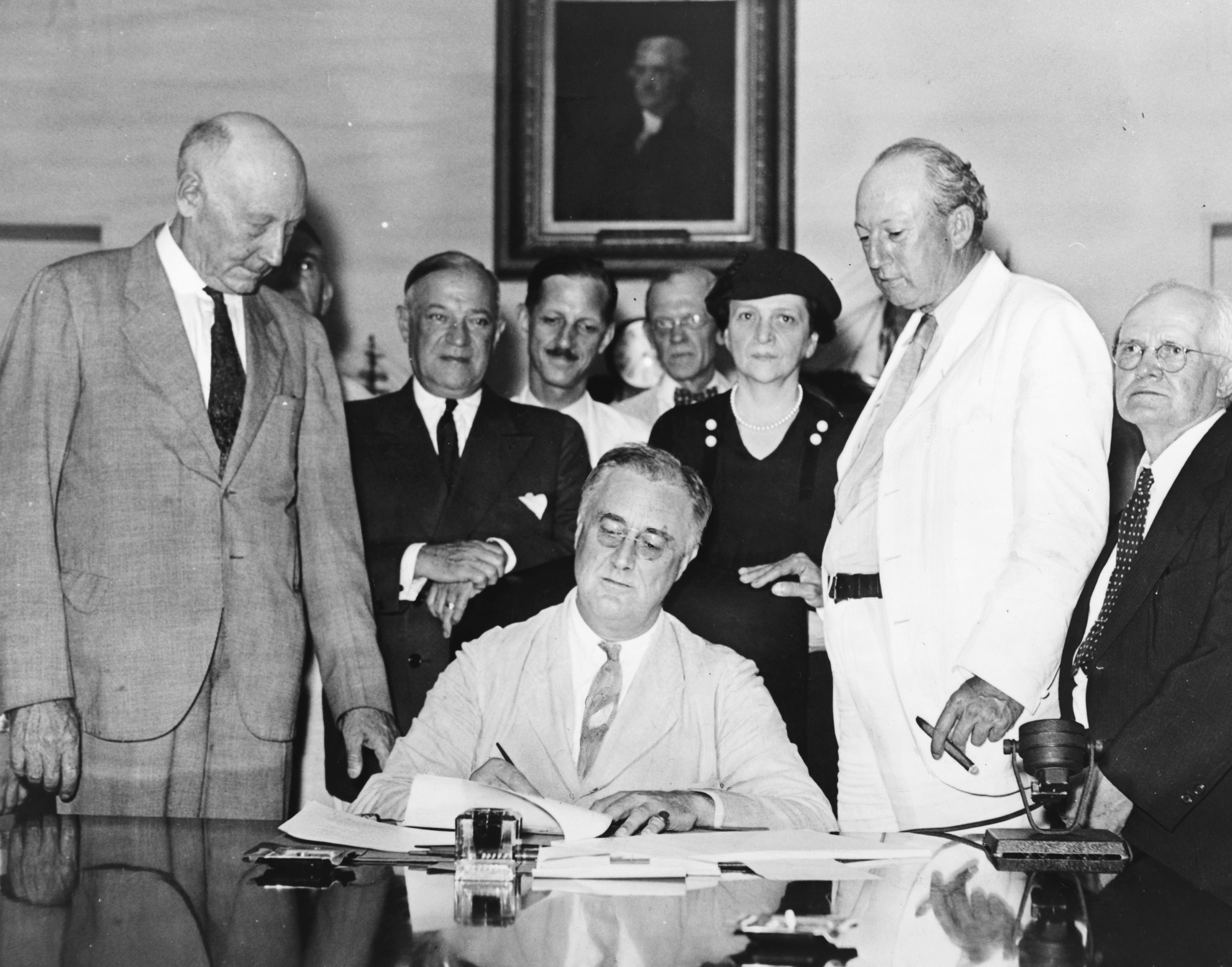
President Franklin D. Roosevelt signs the Social Security Act into law on August 14, 1935.

Industrialization and the urbanization in the 20th century created many new social problems and transformed ideas of how society and the government should function together because of them.

By the 1930s, the United States was one of the few modern industrial countries in which people faced the Depression without any national system of social security, though a handful of states had poorly-funded old-age insurance programs. The federal government had provided pensions to veterans in the aftermath of the Civil War and other wars, and a number of states had established old-age pension systems, but otherwise, the United States had little experience with social insurance programs. During the early Twentieth Century, over a dozen bills providing for national old-age pensions were put forward in Congress but none of them were passed. Congress passed accident insurance bills in 1908, 1912 and 1916, together with an old-age pension bill in 1920, but the benefits provided under these bills only covered employees of the federal government. In 1916, House representative Meyer London submitted a resolution calling for the establishment of a committee to work out the details of a scheme for providing old age, health and unemployment insurance, but this resolution (which encountered opposition from organized labor and the insurance industry) failed to pass, with 106 House representatives abstaining, 138 voting against, and 189 voting in favor. A similar resolution submitted by London later in January 1918 also failed to win Congressional approval; with 199 House representatives voting in favor of a motion to strike out the enacting clause, while 133 voted against the motion and 95 abstained. Congress did, however, pass legislation during the First World War that established various wartime-related cash benefits for veterans and their dependents; covering risks such as death and disability. The then Treasury Secretary William Gibbs McAdoo, an advocate of both social security and this legislation, argued in a statement that what he called this “gigantic undertaking” by the government was “likely to lead us to a consideration of all the possibilities in social insurance as a means of protecting our workers.”

For most American workers, retirement during old age was not a realistic option. By 1931, only 12 states had enacted old age pension laws, although that year fourteen state governors advocated that their legislatures enact measures related to pensions. In the 1930s, the physician Francis Townsend galvanized support for his pension proposal, which called for the federal government to issue direct $200-a-month payments to the elderly.

Historian Isser Woloch writes that the development of the Social Security Act reflected the ambivalent attitudes of President Franklin D. Roosevelt, who envisioned a "comprehensive umbrella of social security" for every citizen "from cradle to grave", including unemployment insurance, national health insurance, and old-age pensions; however, this vision was tempered due to Roosevelt's "instinctive deference to state governments" and "aversion to anything resembling a permanent 'dole'", among other factors. Roosevelt was attracted to the general thinking behind Townsend's plan because it would provide for those no longer capable of working, stimulate demand in the economy, and decrease the supply of labor. In 1934, the Dill-Connery bill for federal funding of state pensions programs, passed the House of Representatives and came near passage in the Senate that May. According to one study, ‘Roosevelt took ‘no open stand on the bill, but called supporters to the White House and persuaded them to delay passage until the administration prepared its own, "more comprehensive version.”’

A similar delay took place in relation to unemployment insurance. Congress had, as noted by one study, “been debating the issue since the Hoover administration, and by 1934, a majority of its members favored unemployment compensation in some form or other.” In February 1934, the Wagner-Lewis bill was introduced, which sought to establish a system of unemployment insurance. The Wagner-Lewis bill was favored by Roosevelt, although Republicans and more conservative Democrats strongly opposed it and (as noted by one study) “was not pushed by the administration with any real vigor. Nevertheless, many close observers believed that had Roosevelt taken a decided stand in favor of the bill it would have been passed by Congress. As with the Dill-Connery bill, the Wagner-Lewis bill failed to pass. According to friends of Roosevelt’s, “his only purpose was to have the problems studied more carefully and that he believed public sentiment was not yet sufficiently crystallized in favor of such a program.” Roosevelt 's predecessor Herbert Hoover had publicly expressed support for unemployment insurance, but not in the form of a government program.

In 1934, Roosevelt charged the Committee on Economic Security, chaired by Secretary of Labor Frances Perkins, with developing an old-age pension program, an unemployment insurance system, and a national health insurance program. The national health insurance proposal was later dropped in the face of lobbying by the American Medical Association. The committee developed an unemployment insurance program that would be largely administered by the states as well as an old-age plan; at Roosevelt's insistence, it would be funded by individual contributions from workers.

In January 1935, Roosevelt proposed the Social Security Act, which he presented as a more practical alternative to the Townsend Plan. After a series of congressional hearings, the Social Security Act became law in August 1935. During the congressional debate over Social Security, the program was expanded to provide payments to widows and dependents of Social Security recipients. Job categories that were not covered by the act included workers in agricultural labor, domestic service, government employees, and many teachers, nurses, hospital employees, librarians, and social workers. As a result,

65 percent of the African American workforce was excluded from the initial Social Security program (as well as 27 percent of white workers). Many of these workers were covered only later on, when Social Security was expanded in 1950 and then in 1954.

The program was funded through a newly established payroll tax, which later became known as the Federal Insurance Contributions Act tax. Social Security taxes would be collected from employers by the states, with employers and employees contributing equally to the tax. Because the Social Security tax was regressive, and Social Security benefits were based on how much each individual had paid into the system, the program would not contribute to income redistribution in the way that some reformers, including Perkins, had hoped. In addition to creating the program, the Social Security Act also established a state-administered unemployment insurance system and the Aid to Dependent Children, which provided aid to families headed by single mothers. Roosevelt believed that social security should cover everyone, stating that “I see no reason why every child, from the day he is born, shouldn’t be a member of the social security system. When he begins to grow up, he should know he will have old-age benefits direct from the insurance system to which he will belong all his life. If he is out of work, he gets a benefit. If he is sick or crippled, he gets a benefit….I don’t see why not. Cradle to the grave-from the cradle to the grave they ought to be in a social insurance system.” Compared with the social security systems in Western Europe, the Social Security Act of 1935 was rather conservative. However, it was the first time that the federal government took responsibility for the economic security of the aged, the temporarily unemployed, dependent children, and the handicapped.

== Titles ==
The Social Security Act has been amended significantly over time. The initial act had ten major titles, with Title XI outlining definitions and regulations. More titles were added as the Social Security Act was amended.

=== Title I: Old age ===
Title I is designed to give money to states to provide assistance to aged individuals.

=== Title II: Treasury account ===
Title II establishes the Treasury account used to pay for Social Security benefits and gives the Secretary of the Treasury the authority to invest excess reserves from the account.

=== Title III: Unemployment ===
Title III concerns unemployment insurance.

=== Title IV: Child aid ===
Title IV concerns Aid to Families with Dependent Children.

=== Title V: Child welfare ===
Title V concerns maternal and child welfare.

=== Title VI: Public health ===
Title VI concerns public health services (investigation of disease and problems of sanitation). It grants the Surgeon General the power to distribute money to the States for that purpose with the approval of the Secretary of the Treasury.

=== Title VII: Social Security Board ===
Title VII establishes the Social Security Board and outlines that it is to be composed of three appointees chosen by the President and approved by the Senate and serving for six years.

=== Title VIII: Taxes with respect to employment ===
Title VIII establishes a payroll tax used to fund Social Security. In the amendments of 1939, the tax was removed from the Social Security Act, placed in the Internal Revenue Code, and renamed the Federal Insurance Contributions Act. When Medicare was established in 1966, the FICA tax was increased to fund that program as well.

=== Title IX: Tax on employers of eight or more ===
Title IX establishes an excise tax to be paid on the first day of every year by employers proportional to the total wages of their employees. It also establishes the first federal unemployment insurance program in the United States.

=== Title X: Blindness ===
Title X concerns support for blind people.

=== Title XVI: Supplemental Security Income for the Aged, Blind, and Disabled ===
Title XVI establishes and concerns Supplemental Security Income (SSI).

=== Title XVIII: Health Insurance for the Aged and Disabled ===
Title XVIII establishes and concerns Medicare.

=== Title XIX: Grants to States for Medical Assistance Programs ===
Title XIX establishes and concerns Medicaid.

=== Title XX: Block Grants to States for Social Services ===
Title XX establishes the rules for state-specific shares of the federal cap according to a formula.

=== Title XXI: State Children's Health Insurance Program ===
Title XXI establishes and concerns CHIP.

== Amendments ==
=== Social Security Act Amendments of 1939 ===
H.R.6635 Approved, August 10, 1939, Public Law 76-379

==== Expansion of benefits ====
The original Act provided for only one Federally-administered benefit: Old-Age Insurance, which was paid only to the insured worker. The 1938 Amendments transformed the very nature of the Social Security program. The Amendments created two new benefit categories under §202 of the Act:

- Payments to the spouse and children of a retired worker called dependents or family benefits, a provision of Old-Age Insurance.
- Payments to the family of an insured worker in the event of the premature death of the worker, called survivors benefits, the provision of the then-newly created Survivors Insurance program.

Retirement-aged wives, children under 16 (under 18 if attending school), widowed mothers caring for eligible children, and aged widows were all made eligible for dependents and survivors benefits.

Under select circumstances, parents of deceased insured workers were also made eligible for Survivors Insurance. To be eligible parents must be at least age 65, not entitled to Old-Age Insurance, wholly dependent upon the insured worker for income, and mustn't have married since the death of the insured worker. Furthermore, the parent(s) are not eligible if the deceased insured worker leaves a widow or unmarried surviving child under the age of 18.

The 1938 Amendments also increased benefit amounts and accelerated the start of monthly benefit payments from 1940 to 1942.

==== Alteration of financing mechanisms ====
The Old-Age Reserve Account previously established under §201 of the Act was replaced by the Federal Old-Age and Survivors Insurance Trust Fund, administered by a Board of Trustees. The Secretary of the Treasury, Secretary of Labor, and the Chairman of the Social Security Board were all ex-officio members. The composition of the Board of Trustees has been significantly altered since.

=== War Mobilization and Reconversion Act of 1944 ===
S.2051 Approved, October 3, 1944

Public Law 78-458

Title XII

=== Social Security Act Amendments of 1946 ===
H.R.7037 Approved, August 10, 1946 Public Law 79-719

Title XIII

=== Social Security Act Amendments of 1950 ===
H.R.6000 Approved August 28, 1950 Public Law 81-734

These amendments raised benefits for the very first time and placed the program on the road to the virtually universal coverage it has today. Specifically it is the introduction of the cost-of-living adjustment (COLA).

=== H.R.6291 ===
Approved June 28, 1952 Public Law 82-420

=== Social Security Act Amendments of 1952 ===
H.R.7800 Approved, July 18, 1952 Public Law 82-590

=== Social Security Act Amendments of 1954 ===
H.R.9366 Approved September 1, 1954 Public Law 83-761

The Social Security Act Amendments of 1954 significantly expanded the Social Security system by extending coverage to approximately 10 million additional people, including self-employed farmers, most self-employed professionals, and state or local government employees on a voluntary basis via referendum. Major changes included a 13% general increase in monthly benefits and a rise in the maximum annual earnings base from $3,600 to $4,200, with a scheduled tax rate increase to 4.0% by 1975. To assist newly covered workers and those with irregular histories, the law introduced a "dropout" provision allowing for the exclusion of up to five years of low or no earnings from benefit calculations. Furthermore, the amendments established a "disability freeze" to protect the insured status and benefit levels of workers during periods of total disability (defining it as a medically determinable impairment lasting at least six months) while also liberalizing the retirement earnings test to a uniform annual basis of $1,200 and lowering the age for exempt earnings from 75 to 72.

=== H.R.9709 ===
Approved September 1, 1954 Public Law 83-767

Title XV

=== Social Security Amendments of 1956 ===
Approved August 1, 1954 Public Law 84-880

=== Maternal and Child Health and Mental Retardation Planning Amendments of 1963 ===
H.R.7544 Approved, October 24, 1963 Public Law 88-156

Title XVII

=== Social Security Amendments of 1965 ===
H.R.6675 Approved, July 30, 1965 Public Law 89-97

Title XVIII Title XIX

=== U.S. Supreme Court cases ===
Two Supreme Court rulings affirmed the constitutionality of the Social Security Act.

- Steward Machine Company v. Davis, 301 U.S. 548 (1937) held in a 5–4 decision that given the exigencies of the Great Depression, "[It] is too late today for the argument to be heard with tolerance that in a crisis so extreme the use of the moneys of the nation to relieve the unemployed and their dependents is a use for any purpose narrower than the promotion of the general welfare." The arguments opposed to the Social Security Act articulated by justices Butler, McReynolds, and Sutherland in their opinions were that the Social Security Act went beyond the powers that were granted to the federal government in the U.S. Constitution. They argued that by imposing a tax on employers that could be avoided only by contributing to a state unemployment-compensation fund, the federal government was essentially forcing each state to establish an unemployment-compensation fund that would meet its criteria and that the federal government had no power to enact such a program.
- Helvering v. Davis, 301 U.S. 619 (1937), decided on the same day as Steward, upheld the program: "The proceeds of both [employee and employer] taxes are to be paid into the Treasury like internal-revenue taxes generally, and are not earmarked in any way." That is, the Social Security Tax was constitutional as a mere exercise of Congress's general taxation powers.

=== Other cases ===
- Flemming v. Nestor, 363 U.S. 603 (1960) upholding §1104, allowing Congress to itself amend and revise the schedule of benefits. Further, however, recipients of benefits had no contractual rights to them.
- Goldberg v. Kelly 397 U.S. 254 (1970) William Brennan Jr. held there must be an evidentiary hearing before a recipient can be deprived of government benefits under the due process clause of the Fourteenth Amendment.
- Weinberger v. Wiesenfeld (1975) held that a male widower should be entitled to his deceased wife's benefit just as a female widow was entitled to a deceased husband's, under the equal protection and due process clauses of the Fourteenth Amendment.

== Impacts ==
In 1940, Social Security benefits paid totaled $35 million and rose to $961 million in 1950, $11.2 billion in 1960, $31.9 billion in 1970, $120.5 billion in 1980, and $247.8 billion in 1990 (all figures in nominal dollars, not adjusted for inflation). In 2004, $492 billion of benefits were paid to 47.5 million beneficiaries. In 2009, nearly 51 million Americans received $650 billion in Social Security benefits.

During the 1950s, those over 65 continued to have the highest poverty rate of any age group in the U.S. with the largest percentage of the nation's wealth concentrated in the hands of Americans under 35. By 2010, that figure had dramatically reversed itself with the largest percentage of wealth being in the hands of Americans 55–75 and those under 45 being among the poorest. Poverty among the elderly, once a normal sight, had thus become rare by the 21st century.

Reflecting the continuing importance of the Social Security Act, biographer Kenneth S. Davis described the Social Security Act as "the most important single piece of social legislation in the entirety of American history."

== See also ==
- U.S. labor law
- List of Social Security legislation (United States)

== Bibliography ==
- Béland, Daniel. Social Security: History and politics from the New Deal to the privatization debate (University Press of Kansas, 2005) excerpt.
- Bethell, Thomas N. "Roosevelt Redux: Robert M. Ball and the Battle for Social Security" American Scholar 74.2 (2005): 18–31 online, a popular account.
- DeWitt, Larry. "The decision to exclude agricultural and domestic workers from the 1935 Social Security Act." Social Security Bulletin 70 (2010): 49+. Rejects speculation that racism was involved in decision to exclude them.
- Ikenberry, G. John. and Theda Skocpol, "Expanding social benefits: The role of social security." Political Science Quarterly 102.3 (1987): 389–416. online
- Lubove, Roy. The struggle for social security, 1900–1935 (University of Pittsburgh Press, 1986). excerpt
- Kennedy, David M. (1999). Freedom from Fear: The American People in Depression and War, 1929-1945. Oxford University Press. ISBN 978-0195038347.
- McJimsey, George (2000). The Presidency of Franklin Delano Roosevelt. University Press of Kansas. ISBN 978-0-7006-1012-9.
- Schieber, Sylvester J., and John B. Shoven. The real deal: The history and future of Social Security (Yale University Press, 1999) excerpt.
