= Economy of Belarus =

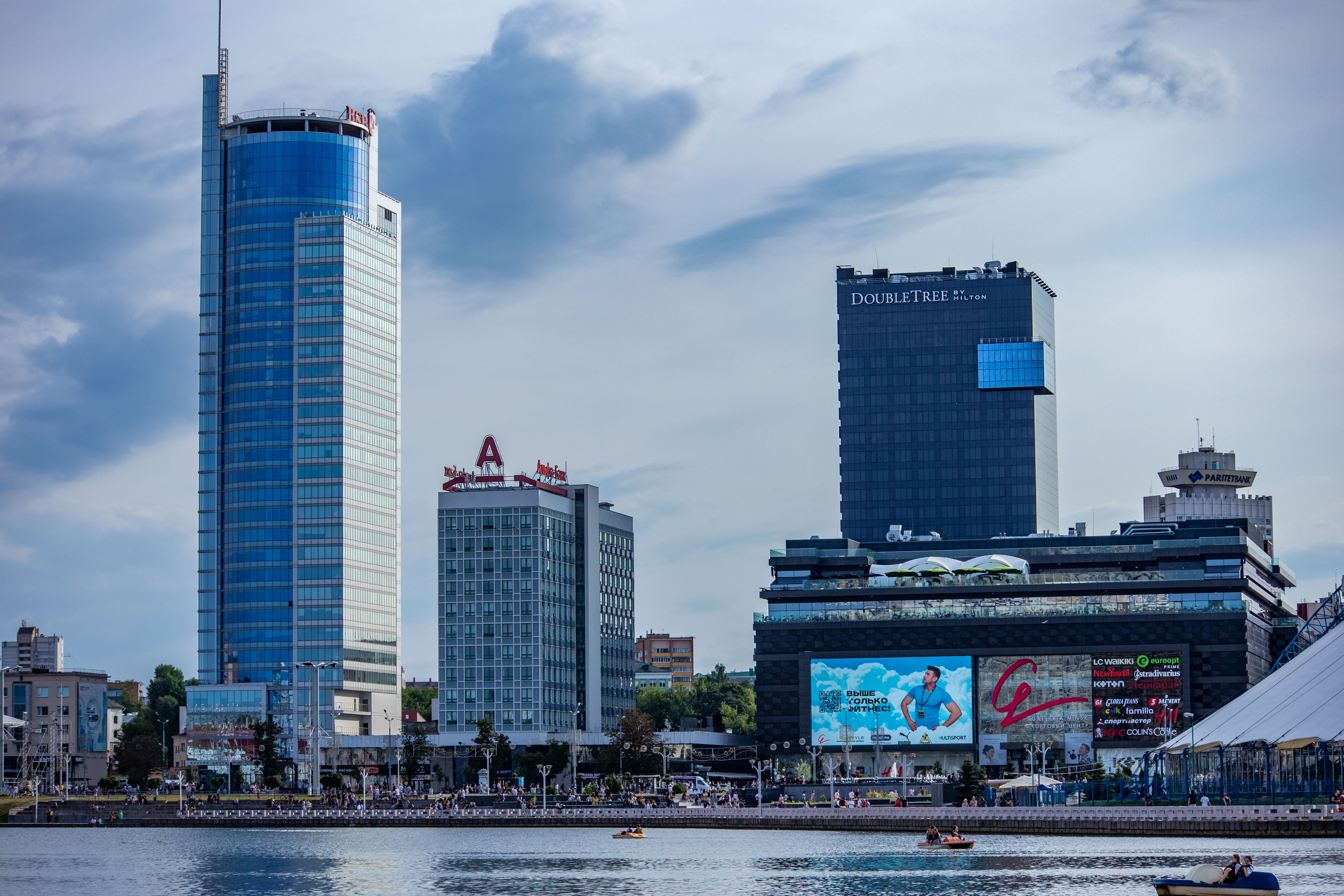
- Minsk, the financial capital of Belarus
- Currency: Belarusian ruble (BYN, Rbl)
- Fiscal year: Calendar year
- Trade organisations: CIS, EAEU, CISFTA
- Country group: Developing/Emerging; Upper-middle income economy

Statistics
- Population: ▼9,408,350 (2020)
- GDP: ▲$102.042 billion (nominal, 2026 est.); ▲$322.020 billion (PPP, 2026 est.)
- GDP rank: 80th (nominal, 2026); 64th (PPP, 2026)
- GDP growth: 1.1% (2025)
- GDP per capita: ▲$11,286 (nominal, 2026 est.); ▲$35,616 (PPP, 2026 est.)
- GDP per capita rank: 87th (nominal, 2026); 64th (PPP, 2026)
- GDP per capita growth: 1.8% (2025)
- GDP by sector: agriculture: 8.1%; industry: 40.8%; services: 51.1%; (2017 est.)
- GDP by component: household consumption: 54.8%; government consumption: 14.6%; investment in fixed capital: 24.9%; investment in inventories: 5.7%; exports of goods and services: 67%; imports of goods and services: −67%; (2017 est.)
- Inflation (CPI): 6.3% (2024 est.)
- Population below national poverty line: ▼5.6% (2018); 0.4% on less than $5.50/day (2020f)
- Gini coefficient: ▼25.2 low (2018)
- Human Development Index: 0.801 very high (2022) (69th); 0.750 high IHDI (2022)
- Corruption Perceptions Index: ▼37 out of 100 points (2023) (98th)
- Labour force: ▼4,835,456 (2024); ▲67.5% employment rate (2018)
- Labour force by occupation: agriculture: 9.7%; industry: 23.4%; services: 66.8%; (2015 est.)
- Unemployment: ▼4.8% (2018)
- Average gross salary: Br 3,003 / €910 (2026 April)
- Average net salary: Br 2,587 / €784 (2026 April)
- Main industries: metal-cutting machine tools, tractors, trucks, earthmovers, motorcycles, synthetic fibers, fertilizer, textiles, refrigerators, washing-machines and other household appliances Agricultural products: grain, potatoes, vegetables, sugar beets, flax; beef, milk

External
- Exports: ▲$28.65 billion (2017 est.)
- Export goods: Agricultural products 19.6%; Fuels and mining products 22.0%; Manufacturers 55.0%; Others 3.5%
- Main export partners: Russia 45.7%; Ukraine 13.7%; Poland 5.7%; Lithuania 5.08%; China 2.8%; Germany 2.7%; Estonia 2.2%; Kazakhstan 2.1%; Brazil 1.56%; Latvia 1.52% (2021)
- Imports: ▲$31.58 billion (2017 est.)
- Import goods: Agricultural products 15.3%; Fuels and mining products 29.7%; Manufacturers 51.5%; Others 3.5%
- Main import partners: Russia 54.5%; China 9.4%; Poland 4.9%; Germany 4.7%; Ukraine 3.9%; Lithuania 2.9%; Turkey 2.4%; Italy 1.4%; Czech Republic 0.96%; United States 0.93% (2021)
- FDI stock: ▼$6.929 billion (31 December 2016 est.); ▼ Abroad: $3.547 billion (31 December 2016 est.)
- Current account: ▲ −$931 million (2017 est.)
- Gross external debt: ▲$39.92 billion (31 December 2017 est.)

Public finance
- Government debt: ▼53.4% of GDP (2017 est.)
- Foreign reserves: ▲$7.315 billion (31 December 2017 est.)
- Budget balance: +2.9% (of GDP) (2017 est.)
- Revenue: 22.15 billion (2017 est.)
- Spending: 20.57 billion (2017 est.)
- Credit rating: Standard & Poor's: B+ (Domestic); B (Foreign); B (T&C Assessment)
- All values, unless otherwise stated, are in US dollars.

Belarus's GDP (PPP). Source: World Bank.

Belarus's GDP (PPP) per capita compared to other states formed following the dissolution of the USSR. Source: World Bank.

Belarus has an upper-middle income mixed economy. As a post-Soviet transition economy, the nation rejected most privatisation efforts in favour of retaining centralised political and economic controls by the state. The highly centralized Belarusian economy emphasizes full employment and a dominant public sector. It has been described as a welfare state practicing market socialism. Belarus is the world's 74th-largest economy by GDP.

As of 2018, Belarus ranks 53rd from 189 countries on the United Nations Human Development Index, and appeared in the group of states with "very high development". With an efficient health system, it has a very low infant-mortality rate of 2.9 (compared to 6.6 in Russia or 3.7 in the United Kingdom). The rate of doctors per capita is 40.7 per 10,000 inhabitants (the figure is 26.7 in Romania, 32 in Finland, 41.9 in Sweden) and the literacy rate is estimated at 99%. According to the United Nations Development Program, the Gini coefficient (inequality indicator) is one of the lowest in Europe.

== Economic history ==
Before the October Revolution, Belarus was a relatively backward and underdeveloped country, heavily reliant on agriculture and with rural overpopulation, although it experienced a rapid economic and industrial growth after the construction of railways in the late 19th century (with Minsk, Vitsebsk, Hrodna, Pinsk and Homel becoming significant industrial centres. The Second World War devastated Belarus, which lost about a quarter of its population and suffered immense destruction of infrastructure.

In the post-war years, Byelorussian SSR rapidly industrialised and became an important trade hub between the Soviet Union and Europe. Manufacturing became a pillar of its economy emphasising tractors, heavy trucks, oil processing, metal-cutting lathes, synthetic fibres, TV sets, semi-conductors and microchips. In the 1980s, more than half of the industrial personnel of Belarus worked for enterprises with over 500 employees. Among the Soviet republics, it had an unusually high export rate of its products, about 80%, and was the most technologically advanced. Because of its role as a producer of products made from raw materials imported from the Soviet Union, Belarus was called "the Soviet assembly shop".

Since the disintegration of the Soviet Union and under Alexander Lukashenko's leadership, Belarus has maintained government control over key industries and eschewed the large-scale privatizations seen in other former Soviet republics.

The period between 1996 and 2000 was also characterised by significant financial distress, in particular in 1998 and 1999 as a result of the financial and economic crisis in Russia. This resulted primarily in a sharp increase in prices and the devaluation of the national currency, a decline in trade with Russia and other CIS countries, growth in inter-enterprise arrears, and overall deterioration of the country's balance of payments. Extreme tension within the foreign exchange market was the key factor that destabilized the economy in 1998 and 1999. In 1999, consumer prices grew by 294%.

Between 2001 and 2005, the national economy demonstrated steady and dynamic growth. The GDP grew at an average rate of 7.4 percent, peaking in 2005 at 9.2 percent. This growth was mainly a result of the performance of the industrial sector, which grew on average more than 8.7 percent per year, with a high of 10.4 percent in 2005. Potatoes, flax, hemp, sugarbeets, rye, oats, and wheat are the chief agricultural products. Dairy and beef cattle, pigs, and chickens are raised. Belarus has only small reserves of petroleum and natural gas and imports most of its oil and gas from Russia. The main branches of industry produce tractors and trucks, earth movers for use in construction and mining, metal-cutting machine tools, agricultural equipment, motorcycles, chemicals, fertilizer, textiles, and consumer goods. The chief trading partners are Russia, Ukraine, Poland, and Germany.

The Belarus GDP grew 9.9% in 2006. In the first quarter of 2007, GDP grew 8.2%. GDP further grew in 2008 by 10%.

Analysis of foreign direct investment to Belarus between 2002 and 2007 shows that nearly 80% of FDI was geared into the service sector, while industrial concerns accounted for 20%. Agricultural FDI was negligible at 1%.

=== Crisis of 2011 ===
Shortly before the 2010 presidential election, average salaries in Belarus were increased by the government to $500 per month. It is believed to be one of the main reasons for the crisis in 2011. Other reasons for the crisis were strong governmental control in the economy, a discount rate lower than inflation and the budget deficit.

In January 2011, Belarusians started to convert their savings from Belarusian rubles to dollars and euros. The situation was influenced by rumors of possible devaluation of the ruble. Exchange rates in Belarus are centralized by the government-controlled National Bank of Belarus. The National Bank was forced to spend $1 billion of the foreign reserves to balance the supply and demand of currency On March 22, it stopped the support to banks. The National Bank also didn't change the exchange rate significantly (3,000 BYR per dollar on January 1 and 3,045 BYR on April 1), so the increased demand of dollars and euro exhausted cash reserves of banks. In April and May 2011, many people had to wait for several days in queues to buy dollars in the exchange booths. In April, Belarusian banks were given informal permission of government to increase the exchange rate to 4,000 BYR for 1 dollar (later 4,500 BYR), but few people started to sell dollars and euro. On May 24, the ruble was officially devalued by 36% (from 3,155 to 4,931 BYR per 1 dollar). But the shortage of the currency retained. As a result of the shortage, a black market of currency was created. In July 2011, the black market exchange rate was nearly 6,350 BYR per 1 dollar, in August, it reached 9,000 BYR per 1 dollar.

In September 2011, National Bank of Belarus introduced a free exchange market session to determine a market value of the ruble. From November 2011 to March 2012, the exchange rate was Br 8,000—8,150 per dollar, but it started to rise in April 2012 and reached Br 8,360 per dollar on 10 July 2012.

Recovery from the crisis was difficult due to isolation of the Belarusian government from the EU and US.

The crisis strongly affected the economy. Inflation reached 108.7% in 2011. Average salary (counted in dollars) decreased from $530 in December 2010 to $330 in May 2011. In May 2012, the average salary reached $436 (3,559,600 with 8,165 per dollar). Refinancing rate (analogue of discount rate) rose from 10.5% in December 2010 to 45% in December 2011 and fell to 32% in June 2012. In November 2011, interest rates of several banks reached 120% in rubles.

=== 2015 unemployment regulation ===
In April 2015, Alexander Lukashenko signed a bill on "preventing freeloading practices" which introduced a fine on unemployed population, among other restrictions. This law obliged all citizens who were paying direct taxes less than 183 days every year to pay a fee in the size of 20 basic amounts (BYN 360 ≈ $250). Mass media compared the bill with a struggle with "тунеядцы", or social parasites, in Soviet Union. Several categories of people were exempt from paying the fee: parents with a child under 7 years old, disabled persons, students, those who were officially registered as unemployed, etc. Avoiding the payment was punished by fines, administrative arrests and penal community works. In January 2018 the fine was abolished.

=== 2020 COVID figures ===
The Belarusian economy was relatively less impacted by the COVID-19 pandemic, caused by relatively light and delayed COVID-19 lockdown and quarantine measures. Professor Victor Sayevich said in September 2020 that Belarus suffered a decline in economic figures of between 1.5% and 2%, whereas European countries sustained drops around 12%. Contemporaneous political unrest and increased state repression also negatively impacted the economy.

=== 2022 Russian invasion of Ukraine via Belarus ===
In April 2022, as a result of its facilitation of the Russian invasion of Ukraine, the EU imposed trade sanctions on Belarus. The sanctions were extended and expanded in August 2023. These sanctions are in addition to those imposed following the 2020 Belarusian presidential election, which was widely criticized by western observers.

== Data ==
The following table shows the main economic indicators in 1990–2023 and future estimates (in light blue) by the IMF. Inflation below 8% is in green. Data for the government debt for the years 2003 and earlier are based on the IMF country reports from 2003 and 2005.

Year	GDP (in billion int$ PPP)	GDP per capita (in int$ PPP)	GDP (in billion US$ nominal)	GDP per capita (in US$ nominal)	GDP growth (real)	Inflation rate (in percent)	Unemployment (in percent)	Government debt (in % of GDP)
1991	—N/a							
1992	51.0	4,992.6	12.8	1,252.8	—N/a	▲970.3	—N/a	—N/a
1993	▼48.3	▼4,711.9	▼11.4	▼1,114.1	▼ −7.6	▲1,190.3	6.3	—N/a
1994	▼43.5	▼4,254.4	▲15.7	▲1,533.7	▼ −11.7	▲2,220.9	▲6.9	—N/a
1995	▼39.5	▼3,881.5	▼10.5	▼1,034.9	▼ −11.1	▲709.3	▲7.7	—N/a
1996	▲41.3	▲4,076.3	▲14.5	▲1,429.1	▲2.8	▲52.7	▲8.8	—N/a
1997	▲46.9	▲4,643.1	▼14.1	▼1,396.1	▲11.4	▲63.8	▼7.6	—N/a
1998	▲51.4	▲5,116.0	▲15.2	▲1,514.7	▲8.4	▲73.0	▼7.2	—N/a
1999	▲53.9	▲5,376.3	▼12.1	▼1,211.0	▲3.4	▲293.7	▼6.9	—N/a
2000	▲58.3	▲5,831.7	▼10.8	▼1,079.6	▲5.8	▲168.6	▲7.0	—N/a
2001	▲62.4	▲6,284.0	▲12.8	▲1,287.0	▲4.7	▲61.1	▲7.1	—N/a
2002	▲66.6	▲6,747.3	▲15.1	▲1,529.8	▲5.1	▲42.6	▲7.5	—N/a
2003	▲72.7	▲7,417.5	▲18.4	▲1,880.2	▲7.1	▲28.4	▲7.9	—N/a
2004	▲83.2	▲8,547.2	▲23.9	▲2,459.2	▲11.5	▲18.1	▼7.3	9.2
2005	▲93.9	▲9,715.3	▲31.2	▲3,232.5	▲9.5	▲10.3	▼6.6	▼8.1
2006	▲106.5	▲11,084.2	▲38.2	▲3,979.1	▲10.0	▲7.0	▼6.3	▲12.3
2007	▲118.8	▲12,422.8	▲46.8	▲4,896.5	▲8.6	▲8.4	▼6.0	▲15.8
2008	▲133.4	▲14,003.3	▲62.8	▲6,590.9	▲10.2	▲14.8	▼5.8	▲20.3
2009	▲134.5	▲14,148.5	▼50.9	▼5,350.6	▲0.2	▲13.0	5.8	▲32.5
2010	▲146.8	▲15,477.7	▲57.2	▲6,033.4	▲7.8	▲7.7	▼5.7	▲36.8
2011	▲157.6	▲16,661.5	▲61.4	▲6,486.0	▲5.2	▲53.2	▼5.6	▲58.2
2012	▲163.2	▲17,270.8	▲65.7	▲6,951.4	▲1.6	▲59.2	▼5.5	▼36.9
2013	▲167.5	▲17,734.7	▲75.5	▲7,994.7	▲0.9	▲18.3	▼5.4	36.9
2014	▲174.7	▲18,493.0	▲78.7	▲8,333.2	▲2.5	▲18.1	5.4	▲38.8
2015	▼169.6	▼17,926.0	▼56.3	▼5,953.8	▼ −3.8	▲13.5	▲5.8	▲53.0
2016	▼166.9	▼17,623.7	▼47.7	▼5,037.7	▼ −2.5	▲11.8	▲5.9	▲53.5
2017	▲174.2	▲18,413.7	▲54.7	▲5,785.3	▲2.5	▲6.0	▼5.7	▼53.2
2018	▲189.0	▲20,026.0	▲60.0	▲6,358.0	▲3.1	▲4.9	▼4.8	▼47.5
2019	▲210.1	▲22,301.6	▲64.4	▲6,838.2	▲1.4	▲5.6	▼4.2	▼41.0
2020	▲233.3	▲24,872.3	▼61.3	▼6,536.5	▼ −0.7	▲5.5	▼4.1	▲47.5
2021	▲251.4	▲27,029.6	▲68.2	▲7,332.1	▲2.3	▲9.5	▼3.9	▼41.2
2022	▲257.3	▲27,878.8	▲73.7	▲7,990.3	▼ −4.5	▲15.2	▼3.6	▼40.8
2023	▲277.9	▲30,280.9	▼71.8	▼7,821.9	▲4.1	▲5.0	▼3.5	▼40.7
2024	▲297.4	▲32,569.6	▲78.8	▲8,633.5	▲4.4	▲5.7	▼3.0	▼38.7
2025	▲309.1	▲34,031.0	▲96.0	▲10,574.8	▲1.3	▲6.6	▼2.5	▼31.3
2026	▲325.6	▲36,024.7	▲108.1	▲11,962.7	▲1.9	▲5.1	2.5	▼31.1
2027	▲339.9	▲37,796.7	▲110.0	▲12,237.6	▲1.2	▲5.1	2.5	▼30.2
2028	▲350.7	▲39,192.2	▲116.0	▲12,960.5	▲1.1	▲5.1	2.5	▼29.4
2029	▲360.4	▲40,487.1	▲123.7	▲13,897.0	▲0.9	▲5.0	2.5	▼28.4
2030	▲370.0	▲41,769.1	▲130.6	▲14,744.1	▲0.8	▲5.0	2.5	▼27.7
2031	▲379.2	▲43,026.7	▲137.4	▲15,586.0	▲0.8	▲4.9	2.5	▼26.9

== Labour market ==
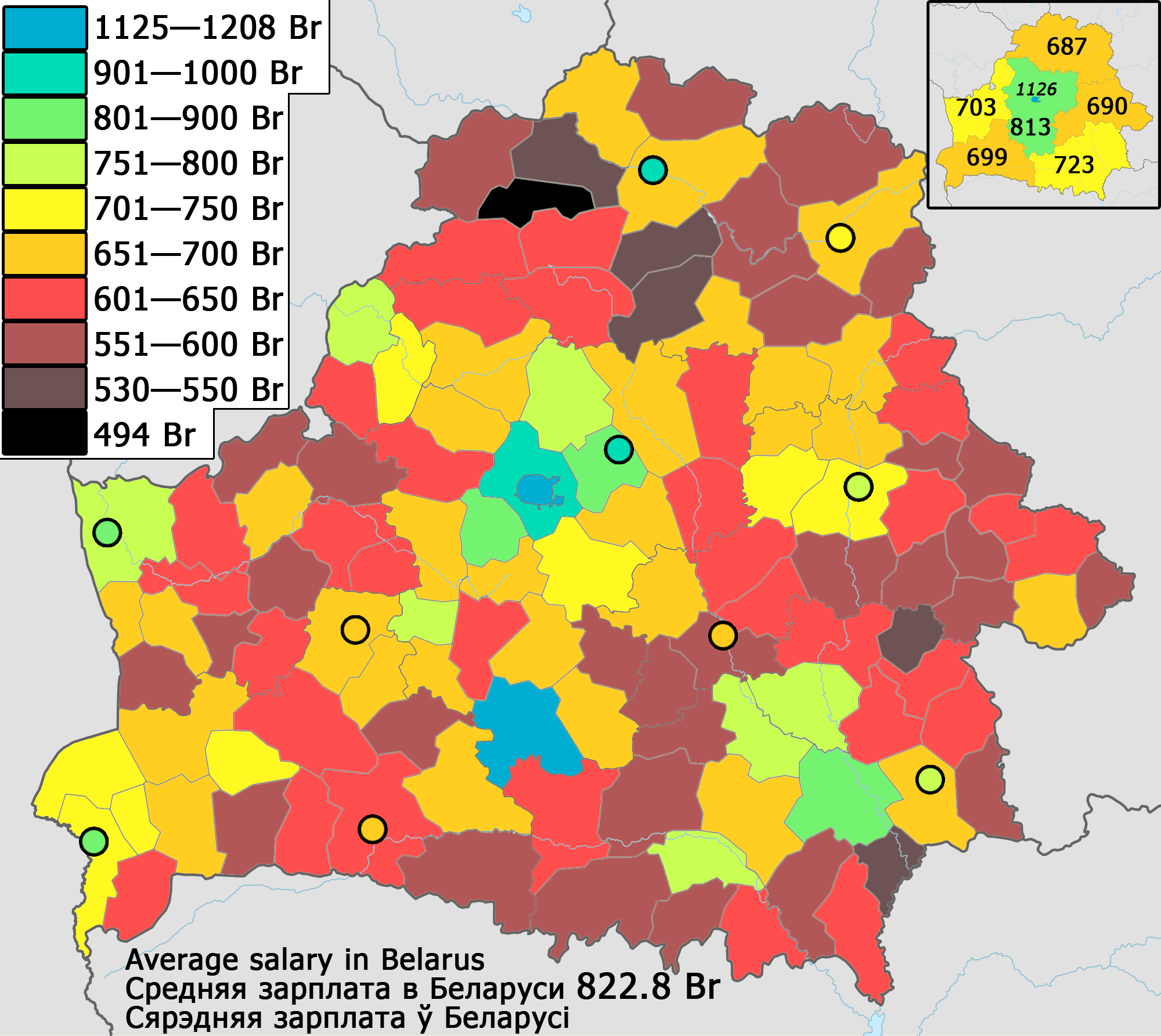
Nominal accrued wages in Belarus by raions in 2017 (in rubels)

=== Wages ===
Following the collapse of the Soviet Union, salaries in Belarus declined and were stagnant until the 2000s. In the next decade, salaries increased, but this growth was not supported by a rise in productivity. This contributed to economic crises, including one in 2011. After another period of stagnation in the 2010s, salary growth has resumed in the 2020s.

Nominal monthly salary by year, $
1990	1995	2000	2005	2010	2015	2020	2024
310.9	65.5	60.2	218.0	413.0	420.7	512.1	700.8

Belarus shows little variation in wages across employment sectors, with the exception of a rise in salaries within the Information and Communication Technology sector during the 2010s.

Nominal wage by sector compared to national average
	1990	1995	2000	2005	2010	2015	2020	2024
Industry	104.5	114.1	120.3	108.1	107.7	102.2	99.5	109.4
Agriculture and Forestry	93.3	62.0	62.4	58.0	68.7	73.4	72.8	80.7
Trade	86.2	80.4	80.3	74.4	86.1	92.3	87.6	91.8
Education	71.9	78.7	76.2	83.8	73.6	72.9	71.7	68.8
Construction	123.8	138.8	126.7	124.3	122.8	112.4	104.6	117.8
Transport	110.8	123.9	108.4	112.1	106.8	100.3	89.0	99.5
Information and Communication	83.3	121.8	108.4	112.1	143.1	235.2	319.4	248.5

Wages across different regions of Belarus are similar, with the exception of the capital, Minsk. They also differ little from wages in nearby Russian regions, although the average salary in Russia is higher.

Nominal wage by region compared to national average
	1990	1995	2000	2005	2010	2015	2020	2024
Brest region	91.1	82.8	86.9	88.8	89.4	85.7	84.1	86.9
Vitebsk region	95.5	91.6	90.3	92.8	89.5	86.5	82.8	83.0
Gomel region	105.9	100.1	96.6	98.6	94.7	90.8	86.0	88.1
Grodno region	94.8	90.5	89.5	91.8	90.8	88.2	84.7	87.8
City of Minsk	113.8	133.4	130.4	121.8	126.3	132.1	139.8	132.2
Minsk region	94.8	95.4	99.2	97.5	97.1	99.3	97.5	99.9
Mogilev region	98.5	94.6	90.2	90.8	89.5	86.2	80.5	82.8

==== Income inequality ====
Belarus has the lowest income inequality among post-Soviet states. According to the World Bank, its Gini index stood at 0.244 in 2020, with the top decile of earners receiving 20.7% of the national income.

Gini index of Belarus
1993	1995	2000	2005	2010	2015	2020
0.22	0.29	0.31	0.28	0.29	0.26	0.24

=== Employment ===
As of 2024, 4.1 million people were employed in Belarus, representing 43.7% of the total population or 84% of those at working age. Of this total, roughly one million worked in Minsk, 650 thousand in Minsk region, and around half a million in each of the other five regions.

==== By sector ====
As of 2024, the government directly employed 38.6% of the workforce, with an overwhelming majority of workers in the energy, mining, healthcare, and education sectors employed by the state. Workers in the real estate, retail, and information technology sectors are primarily employed by private owners.

Share of employed persons by ownership form, %
	1990	1995	2000	2005	2010	2015	2020	2024
Public	73.9	59.8	57.2	51.9	44.7	39.3	39.0	38.6
Private	26.1	40.1	42.4	46.8	53.6	57.3	56.6	57
Foreign	0	0.1	0.4	1.3	1.7	3.4	4.4	4.4

Belarusians primarily work in the service sector of the economy, a share that has risen since the 1990s. Industry accounts for almost a quarter of workers. Most of these industrial workers are employed in state-owned enterprises, which a study by the Directorate-General for External Relations described as a de facto social welfare program.

Share of employed persons by economic sector, %
	1990	1995	2000	2005	2010	2015	2020	2024
Industry	30.9	27.6	27.6	27.0	25.4	23.7	23.5	24.2
Agriculture and Forestry	19.1	19.1	14.1	10.5	10.4	9.6	8.7	8.1
Trade	6.4	9.8	11.0	12.7	13.3	14.5	14.4	14.4
Education	8.4	9.5	10.4	10.4	10	10	10.4	10.4
Construction	11.1	6.9	7.0	7.8	8.8	7.8	6.5	5.8
Transport	6.0	5.7	5.8	6.0	6.7	6.7	6.6	6.4
Information and Communication	1.1	1.3	1.4	1.5	1.7	2.1	3.2	3.0
Other	17.0	20.1	22.7	24.1	23.7	25.6	26.7	27.7

==== Unemployment ====
The Belarusian government publishes multiple unemployment statistics. The initial method, maintained since 1991, consistently reports very low levels, such as 0.7% in 2010 and 0.1% in 2023. This data is contradicted by the 2009 census, statements from its own officials, and data from the IMF and the World Bank. Since 2014, the Belarusian statistical body has begun publishing data based on a labor force survey of a random sample of households. This newer data generally agrees with estimates from international bodies, fully coinciding with the IMF's figures since 2018.

==== Labour rights ====
The government of Alexander Lukashenko has been criticized for its poor observance of workers' rights. The European Parliament passed resolutions condemning these violations as early as 1995. Non-observance of International Labour Organization conventions led to the temporary withdrawal of generalized trade preferences by the European Union in 2005, a decision that remains in force.

In 2021, the International Trade Union Confederation listed Belarus among top 10 worst countries for working people in the world (Global Rights Index). Reasons for worsening of the situation included state repression of independent union activity, arbitrary arrests and severe cases of limited or no access to justice.

During the 2020 Belarusian protests, some activists attempted to start a strike and were met with repression. In 2021, three employees of Belarusian Steel Works were imprisoned for attempting to organize a strike. In 2022, a trade union activist was sentenced to 2 years 6 months of prison for calling to organize a strike committee at Belaruskali potash producer.

== Economic sectors ==
Share of output selected industries in total industrial output in 2008
1. Machinery and metalworking (23.2%)
2. Fuel (21.3%)
3. Food (14.6%)
4. Chemical and petrochemical (13.4%)
5. Electric power (5.50%)
6. Building materials (5.10%)
7. Wood-working, paper (4.40%)
8. Light (3.60%)
9. Other (8.90%)
Sector-focused structure of Gross Domestic Product in 2008
1. Industry (28.1%)
2. Agriculture (8.40%)
3. Construction (9.40%)
4. Transport and communications (8.00%)
5. Trade and catering (10.6%)
6. Net taxes on products (14.4%)
7. Other (21.1%)

In the Soviet period, Belarus specialized mainly in machine building and instrument building (especially tractors, large trucks, machine tools, and automation equipment), in computers and electronics industry and in agricultural production. In 1992, industry in Belarus accounted for approximately 38 percent of GDP, down from 51 percent in 1991. This figure reflects a decline in the availability of imported inputs (especially crude oil and deliveries from Russia), a drop in investments, and decreased demand from Belarus's traditional export markets among the former Soviet republics. Belarus's economy was also affected by decreased demand for military equipment, traditionally an important sector.

In 1994, gross industrial output declined by 19 percent. At the beginning of 1995, every industrial sector had decreased output, including fuel and energy extracting (down by 27 percent); chemical and oil refining (18 percent); ferrous metallurgy (13 percent); machine building and metal working (17 percent); truck production (31 percent); tractor production (48 percent); light industry (33 percent); wood, paper, and pulp production (14 percent); construction materials (32 percent); and consumer goods (16 percent).

In 1996, a Free Economic Zone (FEZ) area was set up in Brest. The programme has been expanded to Minsk, Gomel, Vitebsk, Grodno, and Mogilev. As of 2020, more than 270 foreign organizations have benefited from the opportunity. Membership in a FEZ confers substantial benefits:

* Tax free profits on all goods and services for five years, then a 50% discount

- 50% discount on VAT on import substitution goods manufactured within an FEZ
- No taxes on real estate owned or leased in the FEZ
- Exempt from payments to National Agriculture Support Fund
- No tax on purchasing vehicles
- No customs duty on raw materials and equipment imported from outside Belarus
- A guarantee that legislation governing firms will not change for seven years

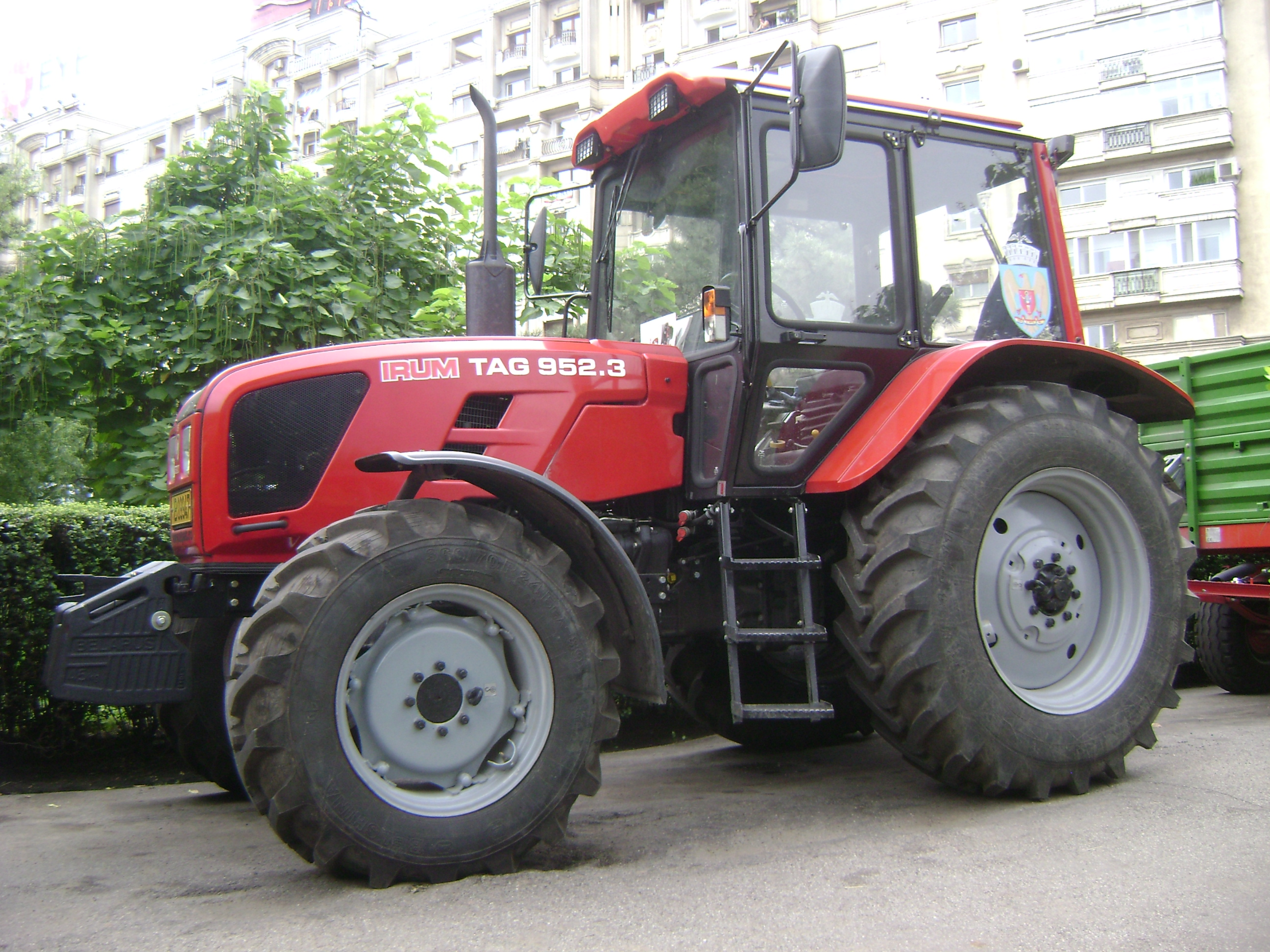
A Belarus tractor at Minsk Tractor Works

As of 2013, some of Belarusian industry was inflicted with overproduction: its unsold goods stocks were estimated to be worth at least US$3.8 billion, including 20,000 unsold Belarus-brand tractors.

Land ownership is tightly regulated in Belarus. The Land Code and Presidential Decree 667 was issued in 2007, and follows strict guidelines according to its targeted use. Approximately 90% of the land is dedicated by this means to agricultural or forestry use.

=== Agriculture ===
Belarus has 5.6 million hectares of arable land. Agriculture is responsible for 7% of employment and GDP and for 20% of exports. It is subsidized by the state, with subsidies equaling 30% of the agricultural output.

=== Textiles ===
As of 2022, the textile industry in Belarus is minor, employing 80,000 people across 2,000 organizations. Its total output is just under $2 billion, with 80% of its products being exported. The largest organization is the state-owned Bellegprom, a conglomerate of companies that collectively produce the majority of the national output.

=== Energy ===
As of 2022, Belarus's total energy supply was 1.11 EJ. This was derived primarily from oil (27.1%) and natural gas (56.0%), with smaller contributions from nuclear (6.7%), coal (3.2%), and biofuels (6.6%). Hydro, solar, and wind power had a negligible impact. Domestic energy production totaled 259 TJ, meeting 22.9% of the country's energy needs. This domestic production came from coal (9.2%), oil (28.1%), nuclear (28.8%), and biofuels (30.7%). Belarus generated close to 40 TWh of electricity, 75% of which was from natural gas. Energy consumption was distributed among residential needs (29.6%), industry (22.2%), and transport (18.7%).

==== Oil and gas ====
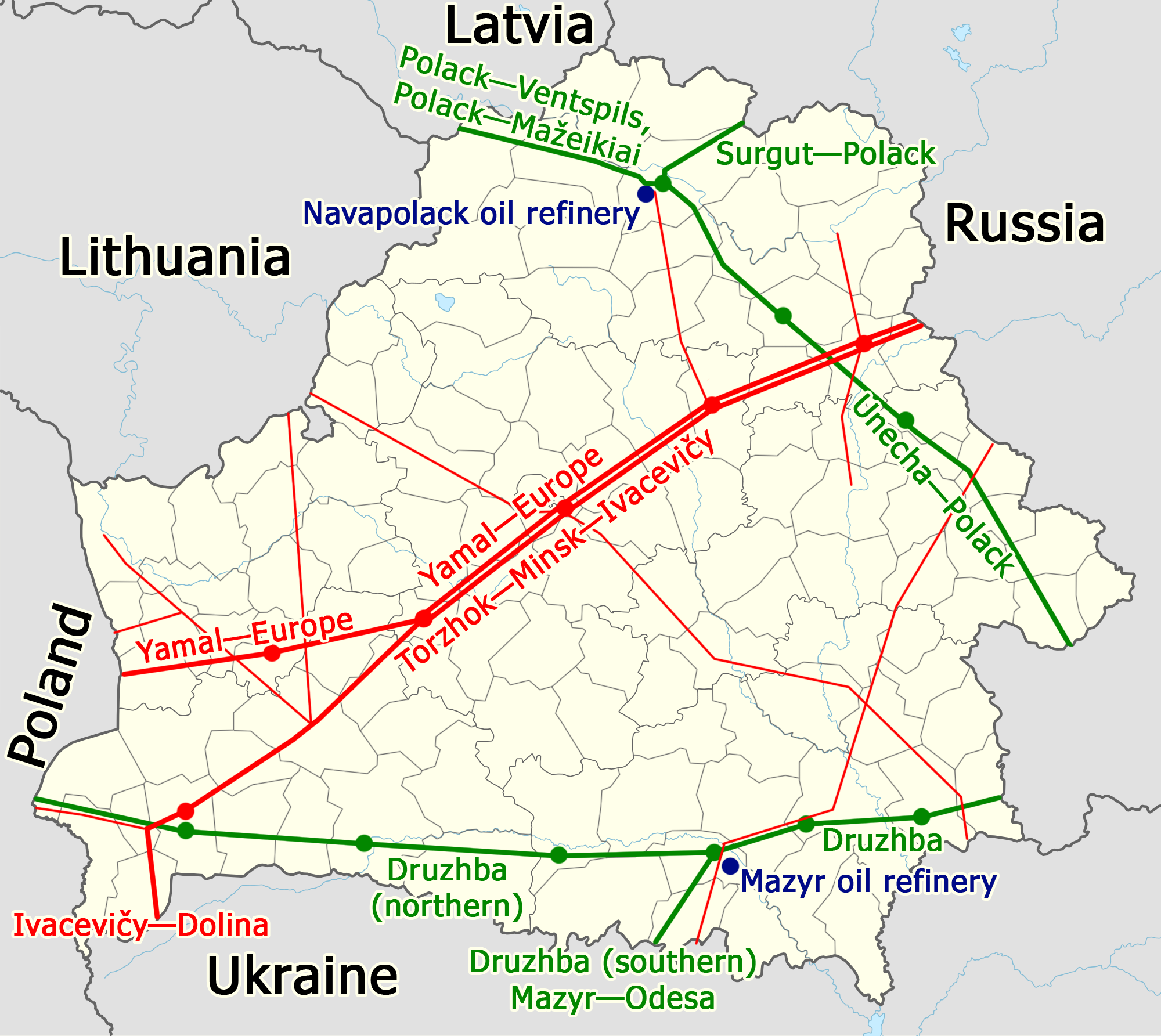
Major gas (red) and oil (green) pipelines in Belarus

In 2018, Belarus's domestic oil production was less than 10% of its 18 million tons consumed. This production is carried out by state-owned Belneftekhim. Of its 20 billion cubic meters of natural gas consumption, 99% was imported from Russia. Russia supplies Belarus with energy resources at below-market prices, effectively subsidizing its economy. The amount of this subsidy varies annually, ranging from 2% of GDP in 2016 to 20% in 2012, with an average of around 10%.

Belarus played an important role in the transit of Russian gas and oil to Europe. The gas pipelines were operated by the state-owned Beltransgaz until Russia bought it in 2011 and incorporated it into Gazprom. The Belarusian section of the Druzhba oil pipeline continues to be operated by Gomeltransneft "Druzhba", a subsidiary of the state-owned Belneftekhim.

==== Oil shale ====
Belarus contains large, but undeveloped reserves of oil shale, estimated at 8.8 billion tonnes. As of 2010, Belarus sought to start exploiting the reserves to reduce its dependence on the Russian hydrocarbons. As of 2020, exploration hadn't started.

==== Renewable energy ====
In 2008, the Belarusian government decided to build a nuclear power plant. It began operation in 2020 and, by 2024, produced 15.7 TWh, accounting for 35.8% of the country's electricity generation.

=== Forestry ===
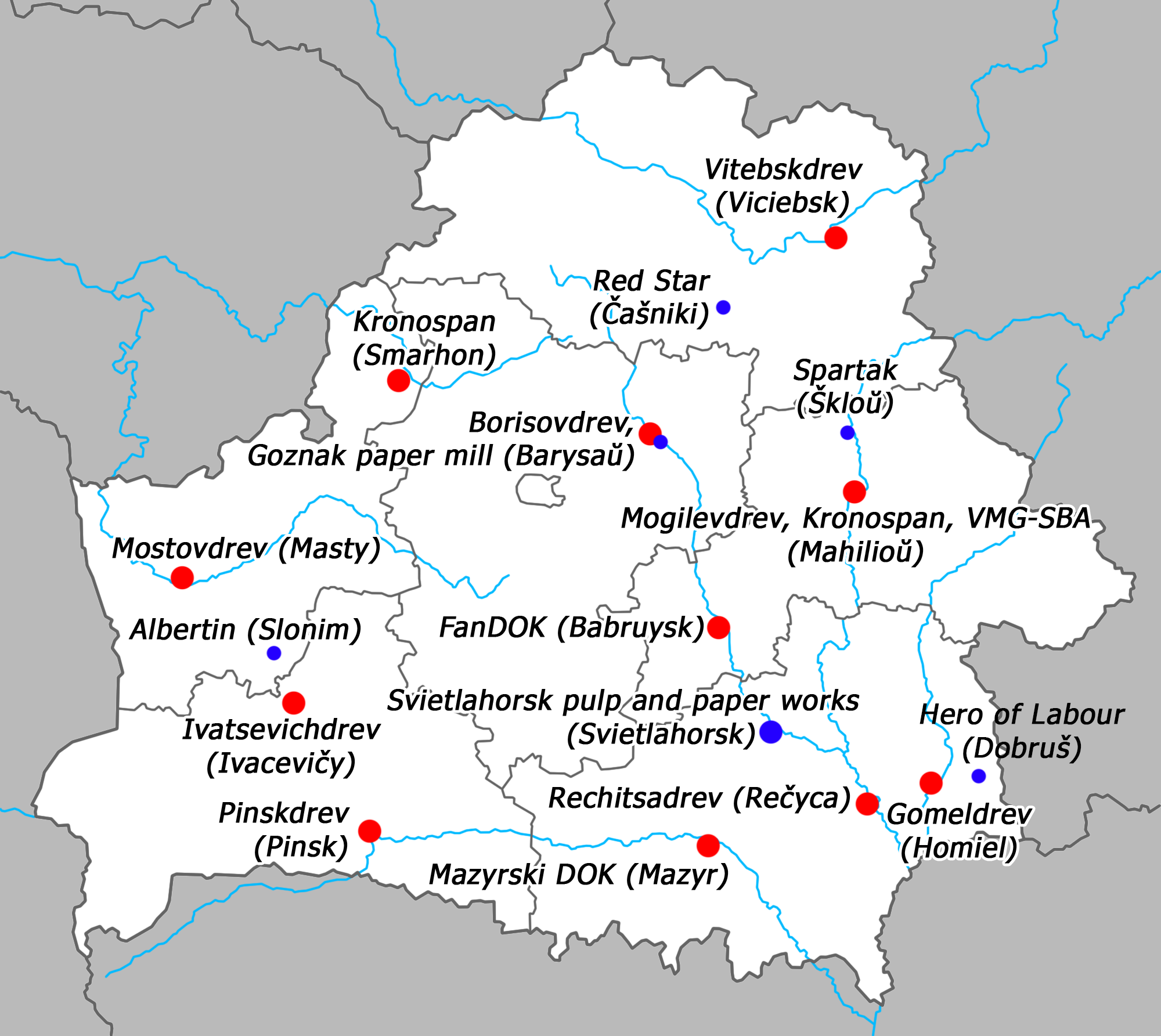
Major pulp and paper mills and woodworking factories in Belarus Major woodworking facilities Pulp and paper mills

With forest covering 40.3% of its area, Belarus's forestry industry employs around 100,000 people. In 2021, it generated $1.3 billion in exports, two-thirds of which went to EU countries. A third of the industry's output is produced by the state-owned Bellesbumprom, one of four company associations directly subordinate to the Belarusian government.

=== Mining ===
While Belarus is not rich in a wide variety of minerals, its most important mineral produce is potash. In 2024, Belarus produced 15% of the world's potash supply, behind only Canada and Russia. Fertilizers derived from it are produced by the state-owned Belaruskali company, generating up to 10% of total Belarusian exports, with most of it sold to China, accounting for 30% of its potash imports.

Other mineral products include peat, for which Belarus accounted for 10% of the world's supply in 2023, and salt, with Belarus responsible for 0.8% of global production.

=== Metal production ===
In 1982, the Soviet Union decreed a steel works should be erected and the Byelorussian Steel Works was established in 1984 in order primarily to process local scrap steel. The major items of production consist of rebar, billet, channel, wire rod and cold heading wire rod. More than 50 alloyed and low-alloyed structural and carbon steel grades are produced by the plant. Two BSW shops produce steel cord, brass bead wire and hose wire.

Aluminum and stainless steel are sourced for the domestic market in Russia and Serbia.

Tsvetmet casts as many as 5,000 tons per annum of non-ferrous metal like copper, bronze and brass; while cast iron and steel parts as large as 8,000 kg are produced by the Universal-Lit company. The latter company is a part of Sergey Romanovich's Niva-Holding empire of integrated engineering solutions for the mining industry, which employs 2,100 people in Soligorsk, Minsk, Mogilev and Urechye across several subsidiary organizations.

=== Manufacturing ===
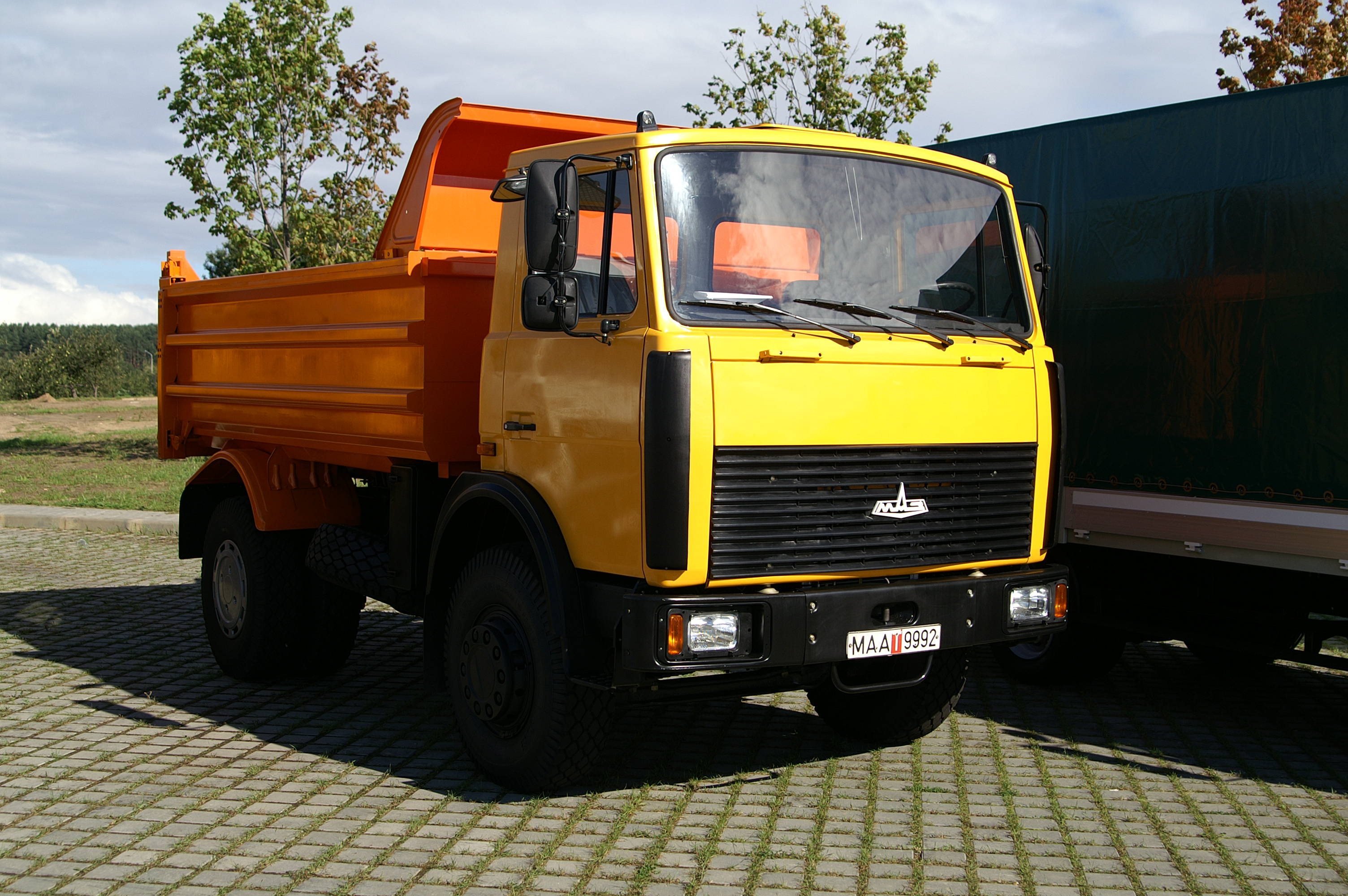
MAZ-5551

Belarus is home to several domestic automotive manufacturers such as BelAZ, which makes haulage and earthmoving equipment, MZKT, which makes heavy off-road vehicles, especially military trucks, Neman, which makes public transport buses, and MoAZ, which makes anything else industrial with wheels. Most vehicles manufactured in Belarus are commercial vehicles. Belarus has been seeing foreign automotive companies setting up partnerships and automotive factories in the country. Belarusian company MAZ and German company MAN have been in partnership since 1997. Belkommunmash makes electric urban transit vehicles.

The most recent partnership has been between American company General Motors and Belarusian company Unison SP ZAO to produce the Cadillac Escalade for Russian and CIS markets.

The Мотавела plant was located in the city of Minsk between 1945 and 2018, but beginning in 2013, the government started to question the will of ATEK Holdings, who had managed the company for a number of years. ATEK was not fulfilling its investment programme, and eventually declared bankruptcy in 2017. The premises have become a sort of multi-tenant light industrial facility.

The government has been supportive of China's Belt and Road Initiative global infrastructure development strategy, leading to the inception in 2012 of the associated low-tax China–Belarus Industrial Park near Minsk National Airport planned to grow to 112 square kilometres (43 sq mi) by the 2060s. This is intended to be a manufacturing centre for the Eurasian Economic Union, with good transport links to the European Union.

=== Chemical industry ===
The Belarusian chemical industry specializes in extracting value from the Russian oil products which transit through the country's pipelines to Germany and the west. Synthetic polymers like nylon, viscose, acrylic, polyester and polyethylene are produced from this stream as well as household chemical products. Oil refineries are located in Navapolacak (Naftan) and in Mazyr (Mozyr Oil Refinery).

More than 500 kinds of chemical and petrochemical products are produced in Belarus by one firm: the Belneftekhim Concern, which is "among the largest and most strategically important" businesses in the country, and was created in 1997, unites most important chemical industries under one umbrella. It provides about 30 percent of all industrial output in Belarus and half of exports, which go to over 120 countries worldwide. More than 70 percent of petrochemical products are sold abroad.

Mineral fertilizers in the nitrogen phosphorus and potassium complex are produced by Belaruskali at the Starobin plant. Belarusian Grodno Azot is one of major players in global UAN fertilizer market.

=== Defense industry ===
During Soviet times, Belarus' radio-electronic industry was primarily oriented towards military applications. With the break-up of the Soviet military and the reduction in size of the new state's military establishments, the Belarus defense sector desperately needs to export to survive. Currently, under Belarusian law, its weapons exports are required to be carried out through one of four licensed weapons trade exporters: Belspetsvneshtekhnika, Beltekhexport, Belvneshpromservis and Belorusintorg. Certain other enterprises are permitted to sell products that they developed or control.

=== Food industry ===
The food processing industry in the country is primarily led by the state concern Belgospischeprom, which exported almost $500 million worth of products in 2024, accounting for 20% of its revenue. As of 2023, there were 19 agricultural holdings, 14 of which were state-owned.

Belarus is a global powerhouse in dairy production, ranking among the top five exporters of milk and dairy products worldwide. Belarus produces over 9 million tonnes of milk annually, exporting roughly three-quarters of its output to more than 50 countries, including major markets in Russia, Asia and the Middle East. In 2009, Russia also expressed its interest in privatizing the Belarusian milk industry. Belarus responded by seeking negotiations with the European Union on certifying Belarusian milk according to EU regulations. Russia then banned the import of dairy products from Belarus, citing alleged health concerns. The brief trade conflict ended when Russia announced that it would lift the ban after both sides reached a compromise.

=== Banking and finance ===
Six commercial banks, four formerly state-owned specialized banks Belagroprombank (agricultural sector), Promstroybank (industrial sector), Vneshekonombank (foreign trade), and Belarusbank (savings bank) and two universal banks (Priorbank and Belinvestbank) dominated the banking system. These former state-owned specialized banks accounts for over 80 percent of the banking system outstanding loans, over 70 percent of domestic currency deposits, and all the NBB's refinancing credit. Many commercial banks are subject to direct and personal influence of the government since many officials at the ministerial level participate in chairing and managing banks. Commercial banks act as agents of the central bank distributing state financial resources. Therefore, also the Central Bank of Belarus fulfills mostly technical functions as the president and government are permanently interfering in the operation of the whole banking sector by decrees and resolutions.

=== Education ===
Education in Belarus is free at all levels except for higher education. The government ministry that oversees the running of the school systems is the Ministry of Education of the Republic of Belarus. Each of the regions inside Belarus has oversight of the education system, and students may attend either a public (state) or a private school. The current structure of the educational system was established by decree in 1994. The education system is also based on The Education Code of the Republic of Belarus and other educational standards.

The Human Rights Measurement Initiative (HRMI) finds that Belarus is fulfilling 90.8% of what it should be fulfilling for the right to education based on the country's level of income. HRMI breaks down the right to education by looking at the rights to both primary education and secondary education. While taking into consideration Belarus' income level, the nation is achieving 85.2% of what should be possible based on its resources (income) for primary education and 96.3% for secondary education.

=== Healthcare ===
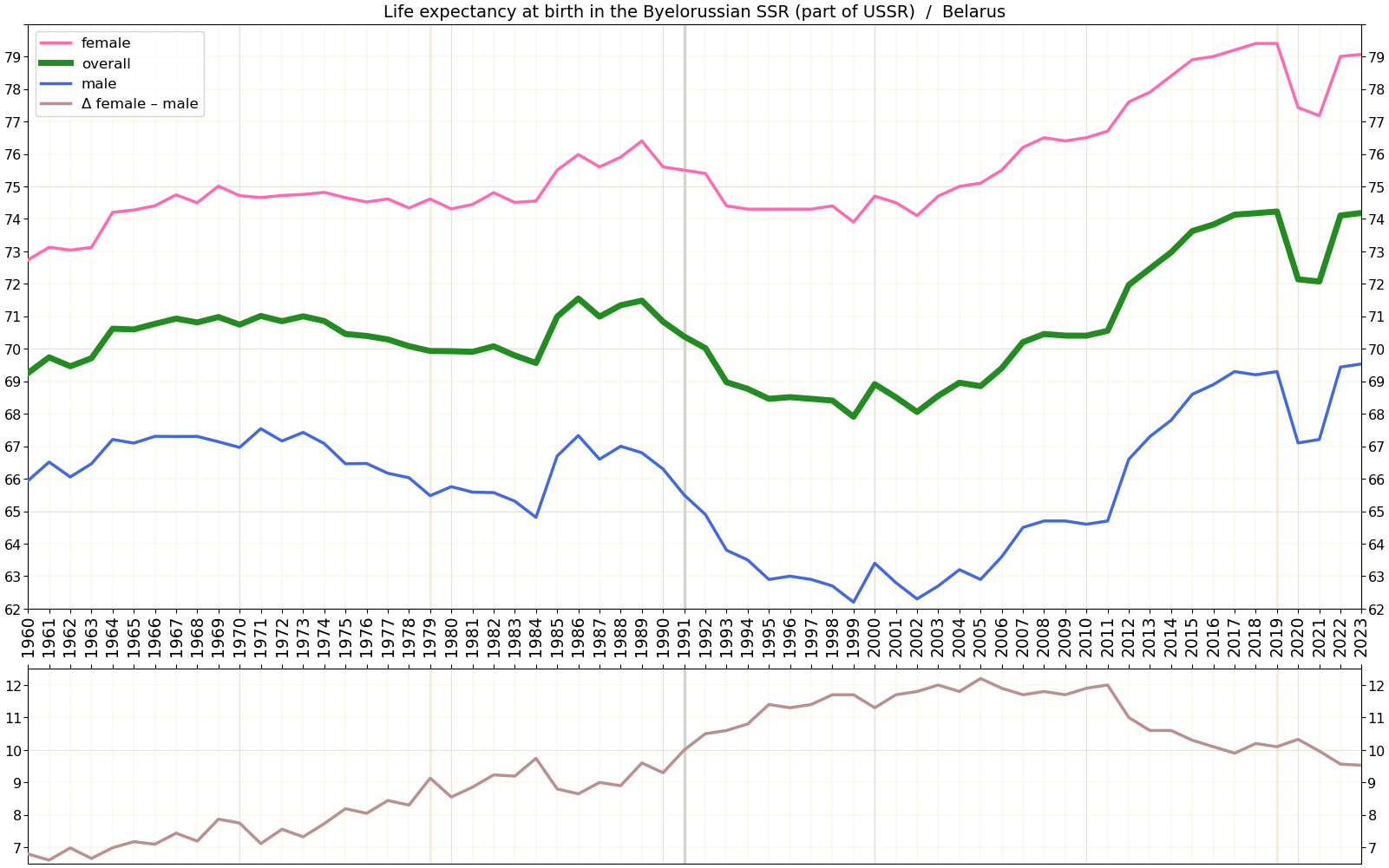
Life expectancy development in Belarus by gender

Healthcare in Belarus is supervised by the Ministry of Health and funded by general taxation through the National Health Service. Belarusian healthcare is inexpensive and easily available, although specialized care is rare.

The country has maintained the system of privileged medical service for senior government officials who are entitled to use the hospital of the Department of Presidential Affairs. It is also available to other patients, but they have to pay.

There is a network of day care clinics in the cities and mobile clinics in rural areas. There is a small private medicine sector, mostly dentistry. Some of the services provided by the state attract a charge.

=== Information technology ===
Information technology was a growing sector of Belarus economy. In the early 2000s, a propitious climate was created in the country: IT companies received a 0% rate on taxes and state subsidies, income tax for tech workers was also reduced. Launched in 2006, the Hi-Tech Park on the northeastern outskirts of Minsk was meant to become Belarusian Silicon Valley. In 2019 Lukashenko visited the HTP and called it his favorite project. By 2020, it hosted more than 750 start-ups and outsourcing companies that employed 58,000 workers. Overall, more than 100,000 citizens worked in IT.

In the last two decades Belarusian IT turned into a major tech hub in Europe, it made up 5.5% of the country's GDP and exported up to $2 billion (€1.69bn) worth of software.

The nationwide opposition crackdown led by the authorities after 2020 protests resulted in significant decline of the previously booming IT sector because most tech specialists fled the country.

Most Minsk-born start-ups relocated to other European countries, only in 2021 more than 15,000 IT workers left the country. More than 3000 tech workers had gone to Ukraine, 1800 employees of 30 companies with total investments of $76.8 million moved to Poland, at least 41 companies went to Lithuania. Such giants as Viber and Wargaming joined the exodus.

The 2022 Russian invasion of Ukraine provoked the second wave of IT brain drain in Belarus. According to Dev.by, it was even bigger than the first one. Almost 40% of companies faced refuses in new contracts due to sanctions, imposed on Belarus.

In August 2021 Lukashenko accused HTP companies of working 'for the USA for half prices'. On April 4, 2022, he commanded to 'deal with the tech workers' and return the IT sector into equal terms with other industries. In March 2022 taxes for IT companies were raised.

=== Tourism ===
Foreign tourists received by organisations engaged in tourist activities in the Republic of Belarus in 2014 by countries (percent of total)
1. Russia (82.3%)
2. Latvia (1.70%)
3. Lithuania (1.50%)
4. Ukraine (1.30%)
5. Germany (1.20%)
6. Poland (1.20%)
7. Turkey (0.70%)
8. United Kingdom (0.70%)
9. Italy (0.60%)
10. Australia (0.60%)
11. Israel (0.60%)
12. United States (0.50%)
13. Finland (0.50%)
14. Switzerland (0.50%)
15. France (0.40%)
16. Slovakia (0.10%)
17. Other (5.60%)

Because of its position, Belarus is actively visited with transit purposes: about 1,500,000 arrivals per year.

Russian people are greater part of the inbound tourist flow, but there is no proper number of their arrivals as the border between Russia and Belarus is crossed without any border control as a part of the Union State policy.

Belarusian health resorts and sanatoriums are popular with Russian tourists because of relatively lower prices. In 2010, Belarus had 334 sanatoria, health resorts and health-improving organizations and other specialized accommodation facilities.

The number of arrivals of foreign visitors to Belarus in 2000 was 2,029,800. Since 2005, this number fluctuates between 4,737,800 and 5,673,800. Private arrivals are the most popular purpose of the travel. In all these indicators, crossings of Russian-Belarusian border are excluded, though they are likely to be significant.

As in 2010, the number of tourist departures abroad was 7,464,200. There were 783 travel agencies (in 2010) in the country and they serve small part of all arrivals of foreign citizens and departures of Belarusians. This also leads to the widespread opinion that tourism in Belarus is negligible. Most of the travel agencies are private, more than 50% of them are situated in Minsk.

The main partners in the field of international tourism are countries of the former Soviet Union, Germany, Poland, United Kingdom, Turkey, Czech Republic, Slovakia, Bulgaria, Sweden, and the Netherlands.

The profit from foreign tourism amounts to less than US$200 per each tourist. The volume of tourism in total export makes up 1%. The most popular among the visitors are: Minsk City (40% of visitors), Grodno Oblast (32%), Brest Oblast (22%), Vitebsk Oblast (5%).

The number of hotels has grown from 256 to 359 in 2010. The intensive construction of new hotels is organized in Minsk because of the planned Ice Hockey World Championships in 2014. But the average rate of use of the hotels does not exceed 40%.

The number of employees in tourism and recreation areas in 2010 were 9,900.

A World Heritage Committee session, held in Durban (South Africa) approved the addition of the Architectural, Residential and Cultural Complex of the Radziwill Family at Nesvizh into the World Heritage List. The castle in Mir was also included in this list.

=== Water supply and sanitation ===
Belarus has extensive piped water and sanitation networks, with roughly 95% of the population having access to safe drinking water and around 81–86% having access to safe sanitation and wastewater treatment. However, aging infrastructure, high iron content in groundwater and a need for wastewater treatment plant upgrades remained key challenges.

== International trade, cooperation and treaties ==
Exports of Belarus by product category (2019) Chemical products Transportation Machines Mineral products Plastics and rubbers Metals Foodstuffs Precious metals Textiles Instruments Animal products Vegetable products Paper goods Footwear and headwear Miscellaneous Stone and glass Wood products Animal and vegetable bi-products Animal hides Arts and antiques Weapons

Belarus became a member of ICSID in 1992 and UNCITRAL in 2004. As of 2009, there had been no cases involving Belarus in ICSID arbitration. As of June 2008, Belarus had concluded 54 Bilateral Investment Treaties (BITs); of these BITs more than 20 were with first-world countries. As of April 2009, Belarus had signed Double Taxation Treaties (DTTs) with 61 countries. As of 2009, the corporate tax rate was 24%. In 2009, a flat tax rate of 12% was imposed on personal incomes, and the standard rate of VAT was 18%. Import and export duties are mostly ad valorem. An environmental tax is imposed on the release of contaminants and the extraction of natural resources.

Belarus is a member of the Eurasian Economic Union. Belarus accepted in 2001 the IMF Agreement that the foreign exchange rate be free of restrictions on payments and transfers. Residents of Belarus need a permit from the National Bank of Belarus to open bank accounts in foreign countries. As of 2009, the social insurance rate payable by the employer was 35%. In 2009, the average monthly wage was $500, and "a rigid wage determination process" was in place. The labour market, which is governed by the Republican Labour Arbitration body, is inflexible and strict limitations apply to severance and termination. The right to strike is allowed for all employees except those of the state, and succeeds on a two-thirds majority. Corporations which wish to hire a foreign labourer are subject to a permit process determined by the Ministry of Internal Affairs. Entrepreneurship "is subject to prolific legislative activity" and "very high number of administrative controls", and although the country signed on to the UN Convention against Corruption in 1995, the Corruption Perception Index had Belarus ranked high in the league tables.

Belarus has concluded a number of Bilateral Investment Treaties (BITs), Treaties with Investment Provisions (TIPs) and Investment Related Instruments (IRIs) according to the database of UNCTAD.

== Environmental issues ==
Belarus has established ministries of energy, forestry, land reclamation, and water resources and state committees to deal with ecology and safety procedures in the nuclear power industry.

The most serious environmental issue in Belarus results from the 1986 accident at the Chernobyl nuclear power plant across the border in the Ukrainian SSR, had a devastating effect on Belarus. As a result of the radioactivity release, many villages were abandoned. About 70% of the nuclear fallout from the plant landed on Belarusian territory, and about 25% of that land is considered uninhabitable. Resettlement and medical costs were substantial and long-term. Government restrictions on residence and use of contaminated land are not strictly enforced.

== Gross Regional Domestic Product (GRDP) ==
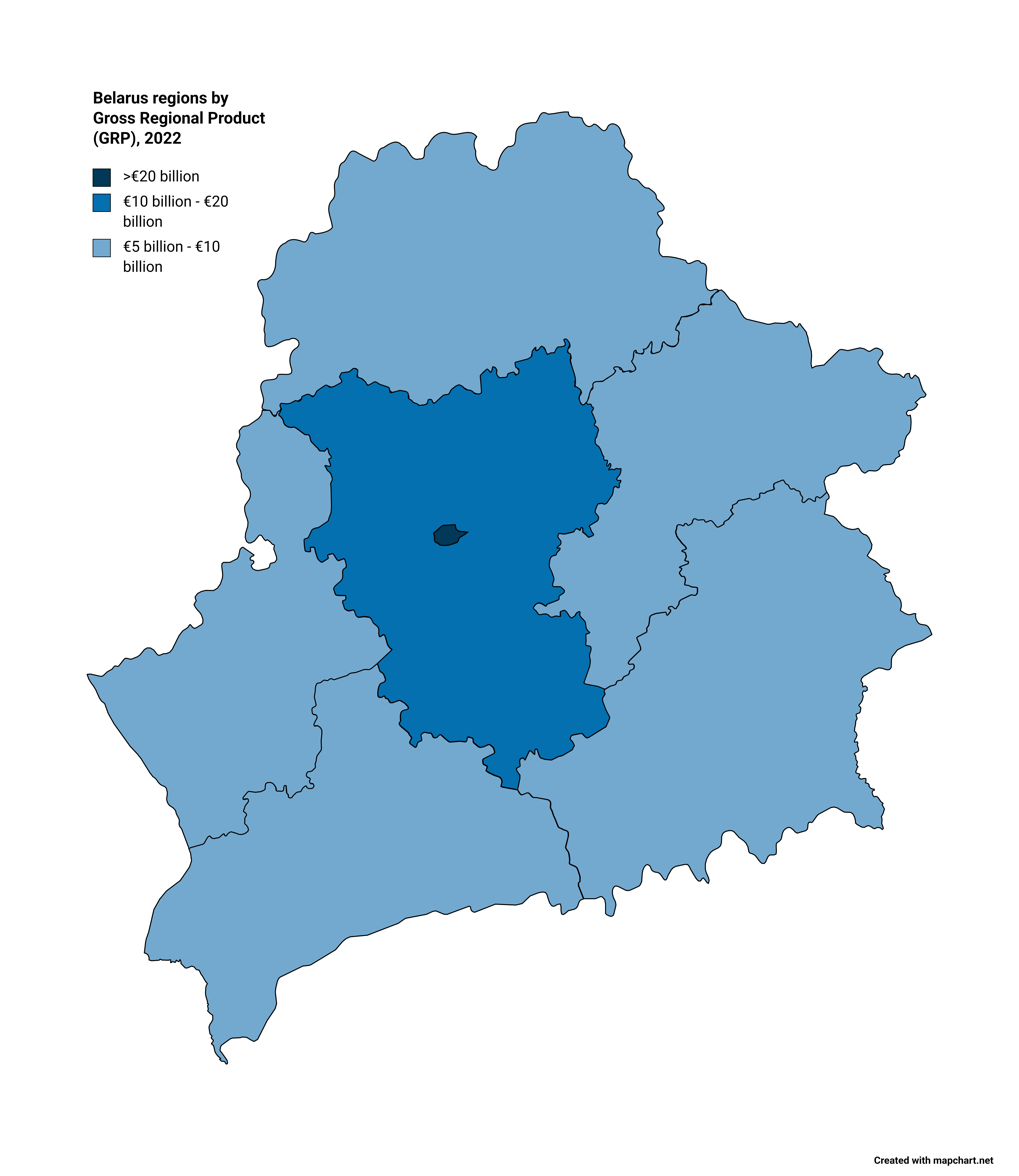
Belarus regions by Gross Regional Domestic Product (GRDP)

Gross regional domestic product in 2024
Rank	Region	GDP (BYN)	GDP (€)	GDP per capita (BYN)	GDP per capita (€)
1	Minsk	Br 80.774 billion	€24.471 billion	Br 40,492	€12,300
2	Minsk Region	Br 48.276 billion	€14.625 billion	Br 33,104	€10,000
3	Brest Region	Br 29.737 billion	€9.009 billion	Br 22,800	€6,900
4	Gomel Region	Br 27.943 billion	€8.465 billion	Br 20,858	€6,300
5	Grodno Region	Br 27.072 billion	€8.201 billion	Br 27,381	€8,300
6	Vitebsk Region	Br 21.870 billion	€6.626 billion	Br 19,600	€5,900
7	Mogilev Region	Br 19.452 billion	€5.893 billion	Br 19,800	€6,000
	Belarus	Br 255.124 billion	€77.290 billion	Br 27,936	€8,500

== Other statistics ==
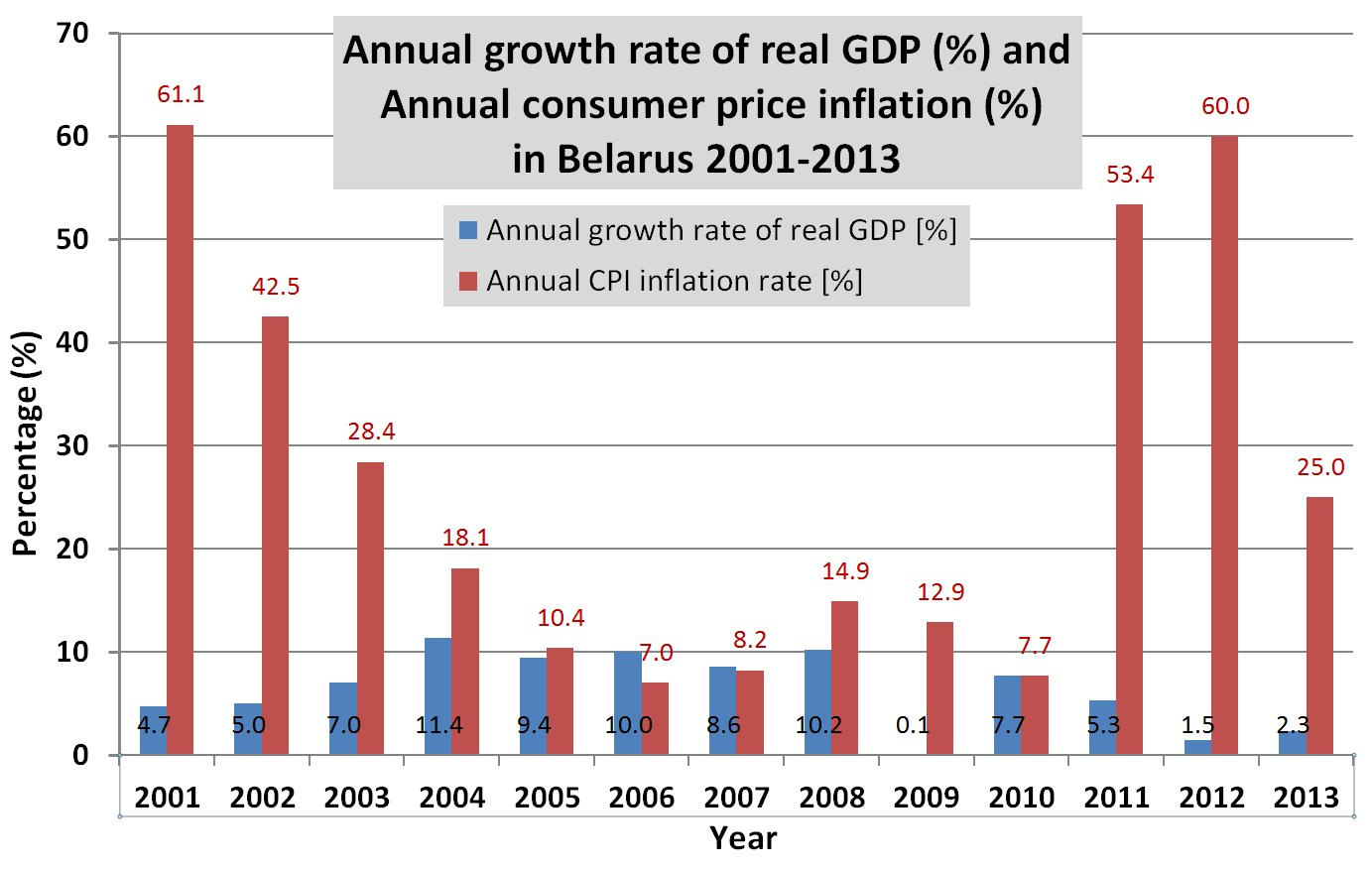
Belarusian annual GDP and CPI rates 2001–2013

Investment (gross fixed)–

- 24.2% of GDP (2005 est.)

Household income or consumption by percentage share–

- lowest 10%: 3.4%
- highest 10%: 23.5% (2002)

Distribution of family income – Gini index–

- 27.9 (123)
  country comparison to the world: 123

Agriculture – products–

- grain, potatoes, vegetables, sugar beets, flax; beef, milk

Industrial production growth rate–

- 11.5% (2008 est.)
  country comparison to the world: 8

Electricity–

- production: 29.91 TWh (2006)
- country comparison to the world: 63
- consumption: 30.43 TWh (2006)
- country comparison to the world: 58
- exports: 5.789 TWh (2006)
- imports: 10.15 TWh (2006), mainly from Russia, Ukraine, and Lithuania

Electricity – production by source–

- fossil fuel: 99.5%
- hydro: 0.1%
- other: 0.4% (2001)
- nuclear: 0%

Oil–

- production: 33,700 bbl/d (5,360 m^{3}/d) (2007 est.)
  country comparison to the world: 67
- consumption: 179,700 bbl/d (28,570 m^{3}/d) (2007 est.)
  country comparison to the world: 61
- exports: 256,400 bbl/d (40,760 m^{3}/d) (2005 est.)
  country comparison to the world: 45
- imports: 394,100 bbl/d (62,660 m^{3}/d) (2005 est.)
  country comparison to the world: 27

Natural gas–

- production: 164 million cu m (2007 est.)
  country comparison to the world: 75
- consumption: 21.76 billion cu m (2007 est.)
  country comparison to the world: 32
- exports: 0 cu m (2007 est.)
  country comparison to the world: 45
- imports: 21.6 billion cu m (2007 est.)
  country comparison to the world: 13

Current account balance–

- -$3.832 billion (2008 est.)
  country comparison to the world: 158

Exports – commodities–

- machinery and equipment, mineral products, chemicals, metals; textiles, foodstuffs

Imports – commodities–

- mineral products, machinery and equipment, chemicals, foodstuffs, metals

Reserves of foreign exchange & gold–

- $8.424 billion ( 2021 est.)
  country comparison to the world: 88th

Debt – external–

- $9.127 billion (December 31, 2008 est.)
  country comparison to the world: 86

Exchange rates–

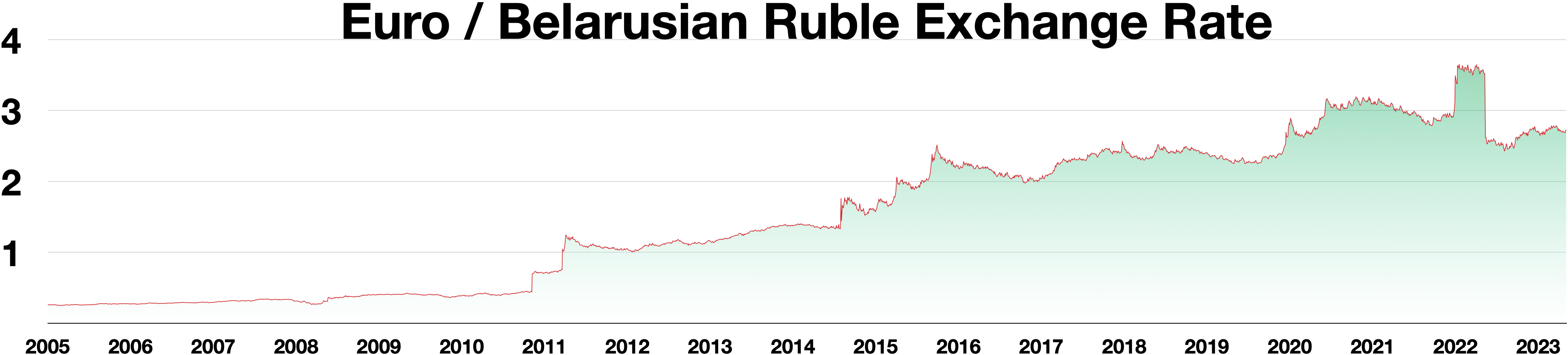
Euro/Belarusian Ruble Exchange Rate

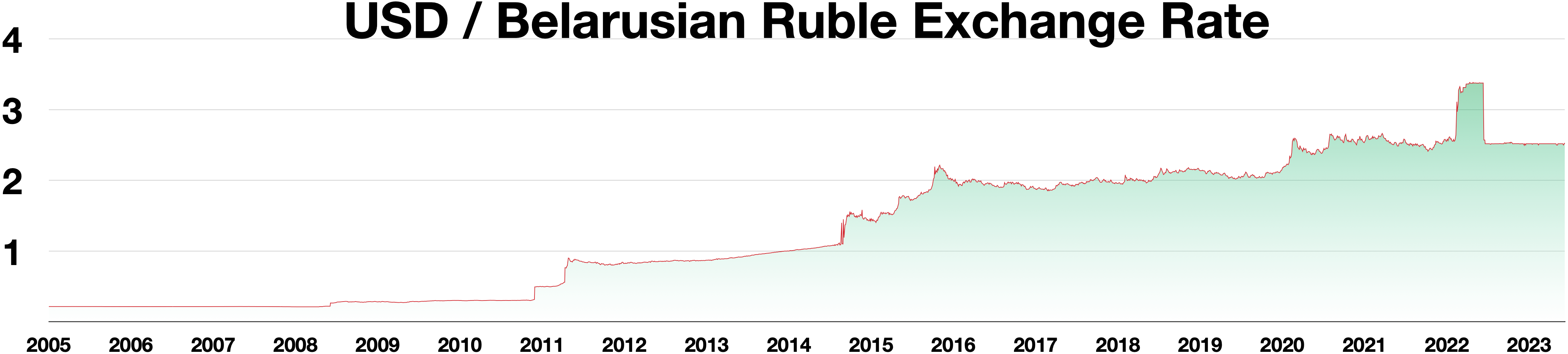
USD/Belarusian Ruble Exchange Rate

- Belarusian rubels per US dollar – 17,500 (August 2015), 10,000 (April 2014), 8,650 (Jan 9, 2013), 8,180 (Mar 7, 2012), 8,900 (Nov 9, 2011), 4,977 (May 31, 2011, after the devaluation) 2,130 (2008 est.), 2,145 (2007), 2,144.6 (2006), 2,150 (2005), 2,170 (2004)

== Sanctions ==
A number of state-owned Belarusian companies were sanctioned by the EU, USA, UK, Canada following 2006, 2010, 2012 and 2020 elections. In 2020 and 2021, the EU imposed sanctions on several companies, including MAZ, MZKT, BelAZ (automotive industry), Dana Holdings real estate company, trading companies Bremino Group, Sohra, Logex, Globalcastcom Management, NNK, and other companies. On 24 June 2021, the EU introduced the sectoral sanctions that affected petroleum and fertilizer production, tobacco industry, supply of dual-purpose equipment, and access to the EU financial markets by the Belarusian government. In 2007, the U.S. Treasury imposed sanctions on Belneftekhim concern and its subordinated companies. They were later suspended, but not cancelled. In 2021, USA renewed them and imposed new sanctions on several companies. In 2021, UK and Canada imposed similar sanctions on several companies.

In 2020–2021, Belarusian authorities made different efforts to circumvent the Western sanctions. They also hid the statistics to prevent revealing the ways used to circumvent them and track their effects. In particular, access to data regarding production and exports of the sanctioned goods became restricted to public. In October 2021, Belstat started to hide data regarding exports of tractors and trucks. Overall classified exports in January–August 2021 is estimated at US$8.2 billion. In September 2021, Alexander Lukashenko mentioned minister of industry Petr Parkhomchik and vice prime minister Yuri Nazarov (politician) as the people who organized the circumvention of sanctions. He also accused several workers of state factories of gathering information about the ways used to circumvent the sanctions, and he threatened them with imprisonment. 13 workers from Grodno Azot fertilizer factory, Naftan oil refinery, BMZ steel mill and Belarusian Railway were arrested by the Belarusian KGB in a possible connection with this statement. It was reported that some of them were accused of state treason. At least two of them were later released. In June 2021, Belorusneft was removed from subordination of Belneftekhim. This move was believed to be connected with the sanctions.

== See also ==
- List of companies of Belarus
- Agency of Deposit Compensation of Belarus
- Base amount
- Belarusian ruble
- Belarus and the International Monetary Fund
- Belarus and the World Bank
- Corruption in Belarus
- Development Bank of the Republic of Belarus
- Ministry of Economy (Belarus)
- Ministry of Finance (Belarus)
- National Bank of the Republic of Belarus
- Unified Settlement Information Space
- Corporatism
- Dirigisme
- State capitalism
- Economy of Europe
