= Indexation =

Economics technique for income adjustment to maintain purchasing power

Indexation is a technique to adjust income payments by means of a price index, in order to maintain the purchasing power of the public after inflation, while deindexation is the unwinding of indexation. It is often used to make sure regular payments, such as pension payments keep pace with inflation, so that they have the same value in real terms over time.

== Overview ==
From a macroeconomics standpoint there are four main categories of indexation:

1. wage indexation,
2. financial instruments rate indexation,
3. tax rate indexation, and
4. exchange rate indexation.

The first three are indexed to inflation. The last one is typically indexed to a foreign currency, mainly the US dollar. Any of these different types of indexation can be reversed (deindexation).

Applying a cost-of-living escalation COLA clause to a stream of periodic payments protects the real value of those payments and effectively transfers the risk of inflation from the payee to the payor, who must pay more each year to reflect the increases in prices. Thus, inflation indexation is often applied to pension payments, rents and other situations which are not subject to regular re-pricing in the market.

COLA is not CPI, which is an aggregate indicator. Using CPI as a COLA salary adjustment for taxable income fails to recognize that increases are generally taxed at the highest marginal tax rate whereas an individual's rising costs are paid with after-tax dollars - dollars commensurate with an individual's average after-tax level. Indexing tax brackets does not address this fundamental issue but it does effectively eliminate "bracket-creep".

Indexation has been very important in high-inflation environments, and was known as monetary correction "correção monetária" in Brazil from 1964 to 1994. Some countries have cut back significantly in the use of indexation and cost-of-living escalation clauses, first by applying only partial protection for price increases and eventually eliminating such protection altogether when inflation is brought down to single digits.

Protecting one of the parties from the risk of inflation means that the price risk must be shifted to another party. For example, if state pensions are adjusted for inflation, the price risk is passed from the pensioners to the taxpayers.

== Wages ==
When a government decides to index wages of government employees to inflation it is to transfer the risk of inflation away from government workers onto the government. Such a policy is to attempt to reduce inflationary expectation and in turn inflation when it is rising rapidly. Research by economists is ambivalent on the success of such policies. Some have deemed it a success including Friedman (1974), Gray (1976), and Fischer (1977). Others have considered it less successful as they observed that indexation breeds inflation inertia (a reduction in the government and the central bank's effort in fighting inflation leading to inflation rate remaining higher than targeted). This perspective is supported by Bonomo and Garcia (1994).

The economists diverging opinions on the merit of indexation often depend on what data they looked at. A given country over a specific time series may have been successful conducting indexation. While another country at another time may have been less successful. Some economists believe there are appropriate times for indexation (when inflation is really high) and times for deindexation (when inflation has moderated after indexation, but remains still too high vs the central bank's inflation target).

In recent years Brazil, Chile, Israel, and Mexico have implemented successful inflation fighting campaigns by implementing the deindexation of wages (Lefort and Schmidt-Hebbel, 2002).

== Debt ==
The indexation of government debt to inflation is related to transferring the inflation risk from depositors to the government in an attempt to reduce inflation. Some governments have ultimately subjected their short-term debt instruments to deindexation so their central bank could regain control of short-term interest rates from a monetary policy standpoint and be in a better position to fight inflation. Another objective of indexation, for certain governments with already low inflation rate, is to reduce their borrowing cost by paying lower interest rates to depositors in exchange for assuming inflation risk. Both the UK and the US have issued inflation indexed government bonds to reduce their borrowing costs. When governments such as the UK and the US issue both inflation indexed bonds and regular nominal bonds, it gives them precise information on inflation expectation by observing the difference in yields between the two types of bonds. Robert Shiller has done extensive research on all mentioned aspects of government bond indexation.

== Tax rate ==
The indexation of tax rate is to avoid an increase in effective and marginal tax rates due to inflation pushing taxpayers taxable income into higher tax brackets even though their pre tax purchasing power has not changed. Tax codes of various countries can be very complicated. As a result, certain types of taxes may be partially or entirely subject to deindexation even though the main tax rate structure is not. This is the case in the US where the standard tax rate is indexed to inflation. But, its parallel Alternative Minimum Tax (AMT) code is not. As a result, a rising share of the taxpayers’ population is anticipated to become liable under the AMT which was originally implemented to tax only the very rich.(On January 2, 2013, President Barack Obama signed the American Taxpayer Relief Act of 2012, which indexes to inflation the income thresholds for being subject to the tax.[1]) In Canada, a recent reduction in tax rate was in part countered by a partial deindexation of certain credits (the credits were adjusted upward by the inflation rate – 3%).

== Currency ==
The indexation of currency or exchange rate often refers to a country pegging its currency to the US dollar. In other words, such a country's central bank would buy or sell dollars so as to maintain a stable exchange rate with the dollar. Such a policy has been adopted by several Asian countries including China. If not for the mentioned pegging, the currencies of these countries would rise against the dollar as a result of the US chronic current account deficit with such countries. But, the Asian countries have a vested economic interest in keeping US demand for their exports high. That's where the pegging of their currency to the US dollar comes in. Often the pegging conducted by central banks is pretty discrete and not disclosed in any formal policy statement. The pegging also can be pretty elastic. A central bank will maintain an exchange rate within a deemed acceptable range instead of at a specific level. Over time, the acceptable range may broaden or narrow depending on such a country's economy overall reliance on exports to fuel growth. Thus, it is challenging to clearly observe the deindexation of a currency.

== See also ==
- Average Indexed Monthly Earnings
- Base amount
- Index (economics)

== Sources ==
- Indexation, Inflation, and Monetary Policy: An Overview by Fernando Lefort and Klaus Schmidt-Hebbel
