= 2011 Belarus financial crisis =

The 2011 financial crisis in Belarus was a set of issues arising in Belarusian economy, caused by year-long negative balance of trade and cost elements of the economic administrative-command system. It was aggravated due to microcap stock fraud and an increase of wages before the 2010 Belarusian presidential election.

The crisis was evident in several currencies, decrease of rate of return of import, inflation and the decrease of purchasing power of the population due to more than 50% devaluation of the rubel. Despite attempts of devaluation and anti-crisis regulation of the economy, the crisis did not disappear, and inflation repeatedly exceeded predicted figures. Many independent experts believe that without structural reforms, the situation will continue to deteriorate. Accordingly, due to the course pursued by the country's leadership, there were problems with obtaining foreign loans.

As a result of the crisis set by the National Bank of the Republic of Belarus, the course of the dollar from 2011 increased from 3,000 to 8,500 rubels and the cumulative devaluation in just ten months amounted to 189%. Due to the lack of currency in exchange offices, a black market was formed in March and April, where the dollar exchange rate reached Br 8,000-9,000 by September. The free exchange rate in exchange offices (since 14 September 2011), at which one can buy cash currency, and the exchange rate at the auctions of Belarusian Currency and Stock Exchange are kept at the level of about Br 8,500, that is, three times higher than the exchange rate at the beginning of the year. For individuals, by decree of the President of Belarus of 6 October 2011, a requirement was introduced to present an identity document when buying foreign currency (cancelled in May 2017).

The inflation of 2011 comprised 108.7%, core inflation (excluding prices for goods and services regulated by the state and those seasonally changing) for January–October 118.1%. This is a high indicator in Europe and CIS. Average salary (counted in dollars) decreased from US$530 in December 2010 to US$330 in May 2011. In May 2012, the average salary reached US$436 (Br 3,559,600 at the rate of Br 8,165 per dollar).
