= International Investment Agreements of Belarus =

Belarus has concluded the following Bilateral Investment Treaties (BITs), Treaties with Investment Provisions (TIPs) and Investment Related Instruments (IRIs) according to the database of UNCTAD.

== Bilateral Investment Treaties ==
No.	Short title	Status	Parties	Date of signature	Date of entry into force
1	Belarus - Equatorial Guinea BIT (2023)	Signed (not in force)	Equatorial Guinea	09/12/2023	
2	Belarus - Zimbabwe BIT (2023)	Signed (not in force)	Zimbabwe	31/01/2023	
3	Belarus - Uzbekistan BIT (2019)	In force	Uzbekistan	01/08/2019	20/08/2022
4	Belarus - Hungary BIT (2019)	In force	Hungary	14/01/2019	28/09/2019
5	Belarus - India BIT (2018)	In force	India	24/09/2018	05/03/2020
6	Belarus - Turkey BIT (2018)	In force	Turkey	14/02/2018	30/12/2022
7	Belarus - Georgia BIT (2017)	In force	Georgia	01/03/2017	01/12/2017
8	Belarus - Sudan BIT (2017)	Signed (not in force)	Sudan	17/01/2017	
9	Belarus - Turkmenistan BIT (2015)	In force	Turkmenistan	10/12/2015	30/11/2016
10	Belarus - Iraq BIT (2014)	In force	Iraq	23/08/2014	11/08/2016
11	Belarus - Cambodia BIT (2014)	In force	Cambodia	23/04/2014	14/04/2016
12	Belarus - Lao People's Democratic Republic BIT (2013)	In force	Lao People's Democratic Republic	01/07/2013	20/03/2014
13	Bangladesh - Belarus BIT (2012)	Signed (not in force)	Bangladesh	12/11/2012	
14	Azerbaijan - Belarus BIT (2010)	In force	Azerbaijan	03/06/2010	01/07/2011
15	Belarus - Estonia BIT (2009)	Signed (not in force)	Estonia	21/10/2009	
16	Belarus - Saudi Arabia BIT (2009)	In force	Saudi Arabia	20/07/2009	07/08/2010
17	Belarus - Mexico BIT (2008)	In force	Mexico	04/09/2008	27/08/2009
18	Belarus - Venezuela, Bolivarian Republic of BIT (2007)	In force	Venezuela, Bolivarian Republic of	06/12/2007	13/08/2008
19	Belarus - Slovenia BIT (2006)	Signed (not in force)	Slovenia	18/10/2006	
20	Belarus - Korea, Dem. People's Rep. of BIT (2006)	In force	Korea, Dem. People's Rep. of	24/08/2006	31/05/2017
21	Belarus - Finland BIT (2006)	In force	Finland	08/06/2006	10/04/2008
22	Belarus - Slovakia BIT (2005)	In force	Slovakia	26/08/2005	01/09/2006
23	Belarus - Bosnia and Herzegovina BIT (2004)	In force	Bosnia and Herzegovina	29/11/2004	22/01/2006
24	Belarus - Oman BIT (2004)	In force	Oman	10/05/2004	18/01/2005
25	Belarus - Denmark BIT (2004)	In force	Denmark	31/03/2004	20/07/2005
26	Belarus - Yemen BIT (2003)	Signed (not in force)	Yemen	18/07/2003	
27	Belarus - Jordan BIT (2002)	In force	Jordan	20/12/2002	22/12/2005
28	Belarus - India BIT (2002)	Terminated	India	27/11/2002	23/11/2003
29	Bahrain - Belarus BIT (2002)	In force	Bahrain	26/10/2002	16/06/2008
30	Belarus - BLEU (Belgium-Luxembourg Economic Union) BIT (2002)	Signed (not in force)	BLEU (Belgium-Luxembourg Economic Union)	09/04/2002	
31	Belarus - Kuwait BIT (2001)	In force	Kuwait	10/07/2001	14/06/2003
32	Belarus - Croatia BIT (2001)	In force	Croatia	26/06/2001	14/07/2005
33	Belarus - Macedonia, The former Yugoslav Republic of BIT (2001)	In force	North Macedonia	20/06/2001	22/11/2002
34	Belarus - Lebanon BIT (2001)	In force	Lebanon	19/06/2001	29/12/2002
35	Belarus - Mongolia BIT (2001)	In force	Mongolia	28/05/2001	01/12/2001
36	Armenia - Belarus BIT (2001)	In force	Armenia	26/05/2001	10/02/2002
37	Austria - Belarus BIT (2001)	In force	Austria	16/05/2001	01/06/2002
38	Belarus - Qatar BIT (2001)	In force	Qatar	17/02/2001	06/08/2004
39	Belarus - Libya BIT (2000)	In force	Libya	01/11/2000	23/02/2002
40	Belarus - Cuba BIT (2000)	In force	Cuba	08/06/2000	16/08/2001
41	Belarus - Singapore BIT (2000)	In force	Singapore	15/05/2000	13/01/2001
42	Belarus - Israel BIT (2000)	In force	Israel	11/04/2000	14/08/2003
43	Belarus - United Arab Emirates BIT (2000)	In force	United Arab Emirates	27/03/2000	16/02/2001
44	Belarus - Moldova, Republic of BIT (1999)	In force	Moldova, Republic of	28/05/1999	19/11/1999
45	Belarus - Kyrgyzstan BIT (1999)	In force	Kyrgyzstan	30/03/1999	11/11/2001
46	Belarus - Lithuania BIT (1999)	In force	Lithuania	05/03/1999	16/05/2002
47	Belarus - Tajikistan BIT (1998)	In force	Tajikistan	03/09/1998	25/08/1999
48	Belarus - Cyprus BIT (1998)	In force	Cyprus	29/05/1998	03/09/1998
49	Belarus - Syrian Arab Republic BIT (1998)	In force	Syrian Arab Republic	11/03/1998	01/10/1998
50	Belarus - Latvia BIT (1998)	In force	Latvia	03/03/1998	21/12/1998
51	Belarus - Korea, Republic of BIT (1997)	In force	Korea, Republic of	22/04/1997	09/08/1997
52	Belarus - Egypt BIT (1997)	In force	Egypt	20/03/1997	18/01/1999
53	Belarus - Pakistan BIT (1997)	Signed (not in force)	Pakistan	22/01/1997	
54	Belarus - Czech Republic BIT (1996)	In force	Czechia	14/10/1996	09/04/1998
55	Belarus - Serbia BIT (1996)	In force	Serbia	06/03/1996	25/01/1997
56	Belarus - Bulgaria BIT (1996)	In force	Bulgaria	21/02/1996	11/11/1997
57	Belarus - Ukraine BIT (1995)	In force	Ukraine	14/12/1995	11/06/1997
58	Belarus - Turkey BIT (1995)	Terminated	Turkey	08/08/1995	20/02/1997
59	Belarus - Italy BIT (1995)	Terminated	Italy	25/07/1995	12/08/1997
60	Belarus - Iran, Islamic Republic of BIT (1995)	In force	Iran, Islamic Republic of	14/07/1995	23/06/2000
61	Belarus - Romania BIT (1995)	In force	Romania	31/05/1995	08/01/1997
62	Belarus - Netherlands BIT (1995)	In force	Netherlands	11/04/1995	01/08/1996
63	Belarus - Sweden BIT (1994)	In force	Sweden	20/12/1994	01/11/1996
64	Belarus - United Kingdom BIT (1994)	In force	United Kingdom	01/03/1994	28/12/1994
65	Belarus - United States of America BIT (1994)	Signed (not in force)	United States of America	15/01/1994	
66	Belarus - France BIT (1993)	Signed (not in force)	France	28/10/1993	
67	Belarus - Switzerland BIT (1993)	In force	Switzerland	28/05/1993	13/07/1994
68	Belarus - Germany BIT (1993)	In force	Germany	02/04/1993	23/09/1996
69	Belarus - China BIT (1993)	In force	China	11/01/1993	14/01/1995
70	Belarus - Finland BIT (1992)	Terminated	Finland	28/10/1992	11/12/1994
71	Belarus - Viet Nam BIT (1992)	In force	Viet Nam	08/07/1992	24/11/1994
72	Belarus - Poland BIT (1992)	In force	Poland	24/04/1992	18/01/1993
73	Belarus - Spain BIT (1990)	In force	Spain	26/10/1990	28/11/1991
74	Belarus - Belgium/Luxembourg BIT (1989)	In force	Belgium	09/02/1989	02/08/1991
75	Belarus - Belgium/Luxembourg BIT (1989)	In force	Luxembourg	09/02/1989	18/08/1991

== Treaties with Investment Provisions ==
No.	Short title	Status	Parties	Date of signature	Date of entry into force
1	Belarus - United Arab Emirates Services and Investment Agreement (2025)	Signed (not in force)	United Arab Emirates	27/06/2025	
2	Belarus - China Agreement on Service Trade and Investment (2024)	Signed (not in force)	China	22/08/2024	
3	CIS Agreement on Services and Investment (2023)	In force		08/06/2023	05/06/2024
4	Eurasian Economic Union - Viet Nam FTA (2015)	In force	Viet Nam	29/05/2015	05/10/2016
5	Treaty on the Eurasian Economic Union (2014)	In force		29/05/2014	01/01/2015
6	Belarus - Kazakhstan - Russia Agreement on Services and Investment (2010)	In force	Kazakhstan, Russian Federation	09/12/2010	01/01/2012
7	Eurasian Investment Agreement (2008)	In force	Kazakhstan, Kyrgyzstan, Russian Federation, Tajikistan	12/12/2008	11/01/2016
8	Common Economic Zone Agreement (2003)	In force	Kazakhstan, Russian Federation, Ukraine	19/09/2003	20/05/2004
9	CIS Investor Rights Convention (1997)	In force	Armenia, Kazakhstan, Kyrgyzstan, Moldova, Republic of, Tajikistan	28/03/1997	21/01/1999
10	Belarus - EC Cooperation Agreement (1995)	Signed (not in force)	EU (European Union)	06/03/1995	
11	The Energy Charter Treaty (1994)	In force		17/12/1994	16/04/1998

== Investment Related Instruments ==
No.	Short title	Date of adoption	Level	Type
1	MIGA Convention	1985	Multilateral	Intergovernmental agreements
2	New York Convention	1958	Multilateral	Intergovernmental agreements
3	ICSID Convention	1965	Multilateral	Intergovernmental agreements
4	Draft Supplementary Treaty to the Energy Charter Treaty	1998	Regional/Plurilateral	Draft instruments
5	UN Code of Conduct on Transnational Corporations	1983	Multilateral	Draft instruments
6	World Bank Investment Guidelines	1992	Multilateral	Guidelines, principles, resolutions and similar
7	ILO Tripartite Declaration on Multinational Enterprises	2000	Multilateral	Guidelines, principles, resolutions and similar
8	ILO Tripartite Declaration on Multinational Enterprises	2006	Multilateral	Guidelines, principles, resolutions and similar
9	ILO Tripartite Declaration on Multinational Enterprises	1977	Multilateral	Guidelines, principles, resolutions and similar
10	UN Guiding Principles on Business and Human Rights	2011	Multilateral	Guidelines, principles, resolutions and similar
11	Permanent Sovereignty UN Resolution	1962	Multilateral	Guidelines, principles, resolutions and similar
12	New International Economic Order UN Resolution	1974	Multilateral	Guidelines, principles, resolutions and similar
13	Charter of Economic Rights and Duties of States	1974	Multilateral	Guidelines, principles, resolutions and similar

== See also ==
- Foreign relations of Belarus
- Economy of Belarus
