= Primary Insurance Amount =

Social Security payment amount in the United States

The Primary Insurance Amount (PIA) is a component of Social Security provision in the United States. Eligibility for receiving Social Security benefits, for all persons born after 1929, requires accumulating a minimum of 40 Social Security credits. Typically this is accomplished by earning income from work on which Federal Insurance Contributions Act (FICA) tax is assessed, up to a maximum taxable earnings threshold. For the purposes of the United States Social Security Administration, PIA is used as the beginning point in calculating the annuity payment of benefits that is provided to an eligible recipient each month during retirement until the recipient's death. Generally, the more a person pays in FICA taxes during their life, the higher their PIA will be. However, specific rules in its computation may deviate from this general rule.

== Computation ==
The main determinant of PIA is the Average Indexed Monthly Earnings (AIME). To calculate AIME, the individual's wages are first expressed in today's dollars by inflating the value to reflect increases in the wage level during the worker's years of employment. The inflated wages are totaled across the highest 35 earnings years. The sum is then divided by 420 (12 months multiplied by 35 years) in order to calculate real average monthly earnings. This estimate of real monthly earnings is referred to as the AIME.

As a redistributive function of AIME, PIA is designed to reward workers who earn more with higher benefits, but also to ensure that benefits do not rise nearly as fast as earnings. Monthly Social Security benefits at full retirement age are determined through adjusting AIME by multipliers at specific earnings thresholds, which are called "PIA bend points". Accordingly, the PIA is the sum of three separate percentages of portions of estimated AIME. The percentages of the PIA formula are fixed by law, but the dollar amounts in the formula change annually in response to changes in the national average wage index. For 2023, the PIA computation formula is:

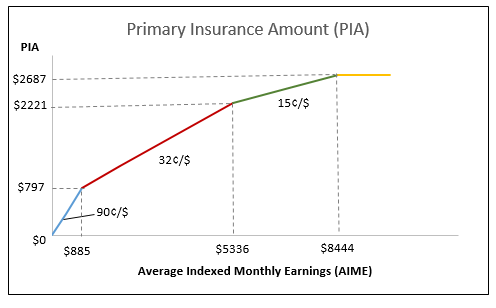
graph of the PIA function

PIA = 0.90*(AIME up to $1115) + 0.32*(AIME between $6721 and $1115) + 0.15*(AIME - $6721)

Accordingly, a beneficiary's PIA will be the sum of:

(a) 90 percent of the first $1115 of average indexed monthly earnings, plus

(b) 32 percent of average indexed monthly earnings between $1115 and $6721, plus

(c) 15 percent of average indexed monthly earnings over $6721

== Conversion to actual benefits ==
The actual amount of benefits provided to the recipient depends on the age at which they claim their social security benefits, relative to their full retirement age. Full retirement age (FRA) is a function of year of birth and is defined by the Social Security Administration as follows:

Age to Receive Full Social Security Benefits
Year of Birth	Full Retirement Age
1943–1954	66
1955	66 and 2 months
1956	66 and 4 months
1957	66 and 6 months
1958	66 and 8 months
1959	66 and 10 months
1960 and later	67

Eligible individuals can begin collecting old-age insurance benefits as early as age 62, which is referred to as the Early Entitlement Age (EEA). Accordingly, individuals born between January 2, 1955, and January 1, 1956, are eligible to accept retirement benefits when they turn 62 in 2017. However, there exists a penalty for collecting benefits before full retirement age: the recipient's monthly benefits are permanently reduced. For instance, if a recipient turns age 62 in 2017, their benefit will be approximately 25.8 percent lower than it would have been at full retirement age of 66 and 2 months. In contrast, recipients are rewarded through delayed retirement credits if Social Security benefits are claimed after full retirement. For recipients born in 1943 or later, 8 percent is added to the yearly benefit amount for each year the recipient delays receiving Social Security benefits beyond their full retirement age. No delayed credit is given after age 69. Eligible individuals who collect their benefits at full retirement age will receive their calculated PIA. More specifically, in 2017, beneficiaries who retire at age 62, full retirement age, or age 70 receive $2,153, $2,687, or $3,538, respectively, in benefits.

== Effects of working on retirement benefits ==
Contrary to common perception, it is still possible to receive retirement benefits and still continue to work. For individuals who decide to accept benefits before their retirement age, $1 in benefits is deducted for each $2 that is earned above the annual limit ($16,920 for 2017). In the year of an individual's full retirement age, up until the precise month of full retirement, $1 of benefits is deducted for every $3 that is earned over the annual limit ($44,880 for 2017). Regardless of the level of earnings, there are no deductions from benefits beyond full retirement age.

== Alternative computation methods ==
Since the Social Security Act was first signed in 1935, new legislation has provided for various ways of computing the PIA. In order to assure that those already receiving benefits are not harmed by newer methods designed to provide more benefits for others, the highest PIA through any applicable method is used.

=== DIB Freeze ===
Social Security procedures indicate that a worker's earnings record can be "frozen" at the time he or she qualifies for a period of disability, thereby preserving the individual's insured status and preventing the loss of future retirement or disability benefits which may be computed without considering periods of disability. A period of disability for a worker is therefore often referred to as a "disability freeze."

=== Normal computations ===
The primary means of calculating PIAs are the following computation methods. These methods apply in most cases, rather than a handful of cases.

==== 1978 New Start Method ====
All benefits payable to beneficiaries eligible after 1978 may use the 1978 New Start Method, also known as the Average Indexed Monthly Earnings (AIME) PIA.

To determine the value of this PIA:

- 1. Determine the Elapsed Years (EY), the Computation Years (CY), and divisor months.
  - EY are calculated by taking the earliest of the year the beneficiary obtained the age of 62, became disabled (if for DIB benefits), or died and subtract the later year of 1951 or the year the beneficiary obtained the age of 22. If DIB Freeze applies, exclude any years partly or wholly within a period of disability.
  - CY are computed by taking the number of EY and subtracting 5; this will give you the beneficiary's base years (BY). The number of BY is the number of years that will be CY; only the highest years are used. For example, if a beneficiary is born in 1960, obtained the age of 22 in 1982 and becomes disabled in 2012, there are 30 EY (2012 − 1982 = 30); there are 25 BY (30 − 5 = 25); and so the beneficiary's best 25 years are used to compute his or her benefit.
  - Divisor months are the number of months in the CY, essentially CY multiplied by 12.
- 2. Index the earnings and compute the dividend
- 3. Determine the Average Indexed Monthly Earnings (AIME)
- 4. Compute the PIA using the applicable PIA formula
- 5. Add any applicable cost of living adjustments

==== New Start Transitional Guarantee PIA Method ====
The New Start Transitional Guarantee PIA Method may only be used for beneficiaries who:

  - obtained the age of 62 between 1979 and 1983
  - are receiving Retirement Insurance Benefits (RIB) or survivor's benefits
    - In the case of survivors benefits, the person whose record is being claimed from must have died in or after the month in which they obtained the age of 62
  - have some earnings credited to their record prior to 1979
  - have not received Disability Insurance Benefits (DIB) prior to 1979 unless there is a 12-month break between entitlement to DIB and entitlement to RIB

==== 1977 Simplified Old Start Method ====
The 1977 Simplified Old Start Method may be only be used for beneficiaries who:

  - have a date of birth between January 2, 1916, and January 1, 1929, or be born after January 1, 1929, and have less than six Quarters of coverage (QC) after 1950
  - have no period of disability which began prior to 1951 and used freeze computation (DIB Freeze PIA)
  - have attained the age of 62, died, have had a freeze computation disability onset or after the age of 62 had a non-freeze computation

==== 1967 Simplified Old Start Method ====
The 1967 Simplified Old Start Method may be only be used for beneficiaries who:

  - filed an application for RIB or DIB after January 2, 1968, or died before that date without entitlement to either benefit, or the benefit is being recomputed or recalculated
  - have at least one QC prior to 1951
  - were born before January 2, 1916, or were born after January 1, 1930, and has less than six QCs after 1950
  - have no period of disability which began prior to 1951 and used freeze computation (DIB Freeze PIA)
  - cannot use the 1977 Simplified Old Start Method

==== 1965 Old Start Method ====
The 1965 Old Start Method may be only be used for beneficiaries who:

  - effectively filed an application for RIB or DIB after 1965, or who could first apply or who died after 1965 without RIB or DIB entitlement, or whose benefits are being recalculated
  - have at least one QC prior to 1951
  - were born before January 2, 1929, or were born after January 1, 1929, and have less than 6 QCs after 1950
  - can use neither the 1977 Simplified Old Start Method nor the 1967 Simplified Old Start Method

==== 1965 New Start Method ====
The 1965 Simplified New Start Method may be only be used for beneficiaries who:

  - effectively filed an application for RIB or DIB after 1965, or who could first apply or who died after 1965 without RIB or DIB entitlement, or whose benefits are being recalculated
  - can use neither 1978 New Start Method or New Start Guarantee PIA Method

== Family maximum benefits ==
There is a maximum monthly amount that is allowed to be paid on an individual's earnings record.

In 2019, for retirement and spousal benefits, for the family of an individual who is at least 62 years old or dies in 2019 before the age of 62, the total amount of benefits payable cannot exceed 150 percent of the first $1,184 of the worker's PIA, plus 272 percent of the worker's PIA over $1,184 through $1,708, plus 134 percent of the worker's PIA over $1,708 through $2,228, plus 175 percent of the worker's PIA over $2,228. The total amount is then rounded down to the nearest multiple of $0.10.

For disabled individual, the calculation of family maximum benefits differs. The family maximum for the family of a disabled individual is equal to 85 percent of the worker's Average Indexed Monthly Earnings, but it cannot be less than 100 percent of the individual's PIA and it cannot exceed 150 percent of the individual's PIA.

== Sources ==
Social Security Program Operations Manual System. Social Security Administration. https://web.archive.org/web/20070610231614/https://s044a90.ssa.gov/apps10/poms.nsf/partlist!OpenView.
