= Belarus and the World Bank =

The World Bank Group was a large international financial institution that provided loans and grants in order to fund capital projects in poor and developing nations across the globe. Its main goal is to reduce poverty worldwide. It consists of five other large international financial banks, each providing funding for different types of projects. Belarus joined the World Bank back in 1992 and has since then received over $2.5 billion in lending commitments since then and in the form of grant financing, it has received $31 million, with much of this funding going towards programs that include civil society partners. Currently, Belarus's active portfolio within the World Bank has a total of $933 million, with it containing a total of nine different projects, as well as two more projects that are currently still in preparation in the areas of energy efficiency and higher education. The majority of this funding has been directed towards the themes of pollution management and environmental health, climate change, and rural services and infrastructures, with the majority of the funding going directly into the central government, other agencies and extractives, and forestry sectors of the country, as well as sustainable energy. In looking to have more economic growth, improving the private sector environment within Belarus could help.

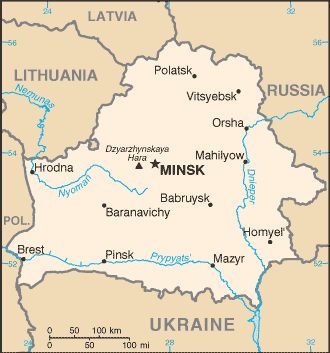
Belarus

Belarus has seen much economic struggle in the past and has struggled to recover from past economic collapses, especially with the collapse of the USSR socialist system making it one of the poorest countries in Europe at the time with around 50% of the population living below the poverty line. In the year 2000, people living within poverty was at a high of 60%, but was drastically cut to below 1% by 2013 as Belarus experienced much of its financial growth between the years of 2006-2011 as expenditures amongst the bottom 40% of the population actually increased during the 2008 financial crisis. Unemployment still remains a major issue today as less than 10% of those unemployed do not even receive welfare benefits. However, even with much of its economic advances, Belarus has since then remained on the decline due to weakness in exports and final consumption, as well as large public debt.

Despite its efforts for economic growth, Belarus has long struggled with a relatively low Gross Domestic Product per capita and continues to even today due to low productivity growth and worsening external environment. Belarus's last record of gross domestic product per capita has it at 6744.50 US dollars back in 2018 and a GNI per capita of 5,670.

As a result of the Russian invasion of Ukraine, on March 2, 2022, the World Bank Group declared that it has stopped all its programs in Russia and Belarus. In addition, it stated that there has been no new lending approved to Belarus since mid-2020.

== Partnerships ==
Belarus has an investment portfolio within the World Bank with a total of 40 projects having been funded, totaling over $2.5 billion with two new projects underway, in association with the International Bank for Reconstruction and Development (IBRD), the International Development Association (IDA), the International Finance Corporation (IFC), and the Multilateral Investment Guarantee Agency (MIGA). The majority of funding has been directed towards the sectors of the central government, other agencies and extractives, and forestry, as well as sustainable energy.

Belarus's current Country Partnership Framework for the fiscal years of 2018-2022 was encouraged and endorsed by the World Bank Board of Directors on April 3, 2018 with its emphasis on: improving the contribution of infrastructure to climate change management, economic growth, and human development, creating opportunities to expand the private sector and promote more efficient public investment, as well as maintaining country's human capital edge. However, even with much work and projects underway to help stimulate economic growth, the World Bank projects growth in Belarus to be at best, 1.5% in 2019 and between 2020 and 2021 the poverty headcount is expected to remain flat, in relation to still positive, but much weaker economic growth, as well as fewer increases in real wages.

=== IBRD/IDA ===
The International Bank for Reconstruction and Development (IBRD) and the International Development Association (IDA) have provided Belarus with about $1.988 billion in total commitments towards utility efficiency, sustainable energy, education, forestry, finance, and others across the total of 19 projects.

=== IFC ===
The International Finance Corporation (IFC) has provided Belarus about $285 million in the sectors of tourism, retail and property, manufacturing, financial institutions and others across a portfolio of 18 projects.

=== MIGA ===
The Multilateral Investment Guarantee Agency (MIGA) has awarded Belarus a total of $243.5 million in guarantees to finance 3 projects, all being towards the financial sector in the country.

== Reception ==
World Bank involvement in Belarus has been controversial to many as it has had positive and negative effects. World Bank involvement in Belarus recently has lowered its economic growth forecast from 1.8 to 1.5 percent in 2019, as well as its relatively un-changed forecast for 2020-2021 being at 1.3 and 1.2 percent.
