= Mimi Sheller =

American academic

- Born: 1967 (age 58–59)
- Education: Harvard University (B.A.); New School for Social Research MA (Ph.D.)
- Known for: Mobility Justice
- Scientific career
- Fields: Sociology
- Workplaces: Worcester Polytechnic Institute: Lancaster University Drexel University Swarthmore College
- Doctoral advisor: Charles Tilly
- Other academic advisors: Mustafa Emirbayer, William Roseberry, John Urry, Harrison White

Mimi Sheller (born 1967) is Dean of The Global School at Worcester Polytechnic Institute in Massachusetts, USA. From 2009 to 2021 she was professor of sociology in the Department of Culture and Communication, and the founding Director of the New Mobilities Research and Policy Center at Drexel University in Philadelphia. She is widely cited and considered a "key theorist in mobilities studies" and specializes in the post-colonial context of the Caribbean.

== Career ==
She attended Harvard College where she earned a B.A. in History and Literature, summa cum laude, in 1988. She received an MA in Sociology and Historical Studies in 1993 and a PhD in 1998 at the New School for Social Research. She completed her dissertation under the supervision of Charles Tilly, William Roseberry, and Mustafa Emirbayer. From 1997 to 1998, Sheller was the Dubois-Mandela-Rodney Postdoctoral Fellow at the Center for African and Afroamerican Studies at the University of Michigan-Ann Arbor.

She is a founding director (while working in her first job as a lecturer in the 2000s) and visiting senior research fellow at the Center for Mobilities Research and Policy (CeMoRe) at Lancaster University in England. In 2003, she earned a Postgraduate Certificate in Learning and Teaching in Higher Education from Lancaster University.

Along with British sociologist John Urry, she co-founded the academic journal Mobilities, and was a co-editor for the journal before stepping down in 2021. She is also the Associate Editor of Transfers: Interdisciplinary Journal of Mobility Studies.

== Contributions ==
Her first book, Democracy After Slavery: Black Publics and Peasant Radicalism in Haiti and Jamaica, received the Choice Magazine Outstanding Book Award in 2002. Her second book, published in 2003, was also based on her dissertation work, entitled Consuming the Caribbean: From Arawaks to Zombies.

In 2004, along with John Urry, Sheller published a book chapter entitled "The New Mobilities Paradigm," which "marked a significant step in the theorizing of mobilities" by "[arguing] that travel and communication technologies have enabled the proliferation of connections at a distance and that such distant and intermittent connections are crucial in holding social life together." Again with Urry, she co-edited two mobilities anthologies: Tourism Mobilities: Places to Play, Places in Play and Mobile Technologies of the City.

In 2011, Sheller joined a team of experts invited by the Earthquake Engineering Research Institute, which provided advice to the World Bank's Global Facility for Disaster Reduction and Recovery. The team reviewed and analyzed data from the 2011 Tohoku, Japan earthquake and tsunami.

Her book Citizenship from Below: Erotic Agency and Caribbean Freedom was published in 2012, and according to Diana Paton, is a "stimulating, thought-provoking book of lasting significance." Aluminum Dreams: the Making of Light Modernity was published in 2014 by MIT Press. Her latest book is Island Futures: Caribbean Survival in the Anthropocene (Duke University Press, 2020).

Sheller is the co-editor of the 2013 Routledge Handbook of Mobilities (along with Peter Adey, David Bissell, Kevin Hannam and Peter Merriman) and the 2014 book Mobility and Locative Media: Mobile Communication in Hybrid Spaces (with Adriana de Souza e Silva).

== Awards ==
- Provost Award for Outstanding Career Scholarly Achievement, Drexel University
- Honorary doctorate, Roskilde University
- David G. Nicholls Memorial Prize, Society of Caribbean Studies
