= List of Old Haberdashers =

The Haberdashers' Boys' School (commonly referred to as Habs) is a British independent school for pupils aged 4 to 18 in Elstree, Hertfordshire, England which is a member of the Headmasters' and Headmistresses' Conference and the Haileybury Group.

Former students at Haberdashers' are referred to as Old Haberdashers. A number of former Haberdashers' students have entered the comedy and acting professions, of whom Sacha Baron Cohen, Matt Lucas and Jason Isaacs are particularly prominent.

Haberdashers' has also produced a number of statesmen and others in the political sphere, with the former Minister for the Cabinet Office and Chancellor of the Duchy of Lancaster, David Lidington, and former Home Secretary, Leon Brittan (Baron Brittan of Spennithorne), being former pupils of the School. The historian Simon Schama, a frequent contributor to television and radio programmes, and Brian Sewell, 'Britain's most famous and controversial art critic', are also Old Haberdashers'.

== Politics ==
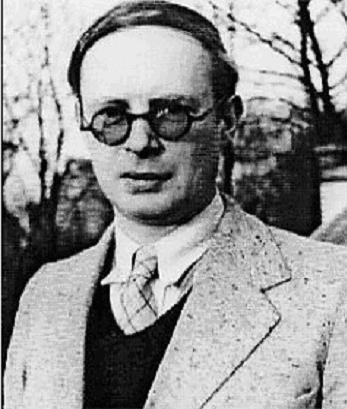
Frederick Augustus Voigt (1892–1957), journalist, known for campaigning against Hitler and Communist Russia

- The Rt Hon Lord Brittan of Spennithorne, QC, DL
- Roy W Brown, former President of the International Humanist and Ethical Union, now its Chief Representative to UN
- The Rt Hon Lord Feldman of Elstree, Conservative Party Chairman
- Lance Forman (Anisfeld), former MEP
- The Rt Hon Lord Foulkes of Cumnock
- The Lord Harris of Haringey, Labour politician and former President of the Cambridge Union
- The Hon Daniel Levy, lobbyist and one of the architects of the Geneva Accord
- The Rt Hon Sir David Lidington, KCB, CBE, Minister for the Cabinet Office and Chancellor of the Duchy of Lancaster from January 2018 to July 2019, Conservative MP
- Alderman Ian Luder CBE, 681st Lord Mayor of the City of London
- Sir Henry Phillips CMG, MBE (1914–2004), colonial administrator
- Daniel Taub, former Israeli Ambassador to the UK
- Frederick Augustus Voigt, 1892–1957, known for his work with the Manchester Guardian and his opposition to dictatorship and totalitarianism on the Continent
- Matt Warman, former Digital Minister and MP for Boston and Skegness
- The Rt Hon Lord Wills
- Tony Kerpel, former Conservative politician and adviser

== Scientists ==
- Norman Bleehen CBE FRCR FRCP — Oncologist
- John Buckingham (chemist) — Organic Chemistry
- Michael Stratton — director of the Wellcome Sanger Institute and CEO of the Wellcome Genome Campus
- Richard Treisman FRS — research director of the Francis Crick Institute

== Academia ==
- John Bamborough, founder of Linacre College, Oxford
- Richard Bellamy, FBA MAE, Professor of Political Science, University College, London
- Jeremy Black, historian and broadcaster
- Andrew Donald Booth (1918–2009), computer pioneer
- John Lust (1918 - 2000), orientalist
- Dr. Alan J. Charig (1927–1997), paleontologist
- Geoffrey Crossick PhD FRHistS, professor of the humanities, School of Advanced Study, University of London. Formerly vice-Chancellor of London University 2010–2012
- Simon Baron-Cohen, fellow - Trinity College, Cambridge
- Mark Damazer CBE, former master of St Peter's College, Oxford and former controller of BBC Radio 4
- Anthony Freeling, president of Hughes Hall, Cambridge
- Ralph Freeman (1880–1950), engineer and architect of the Sydney Harbour Bridge
- George Garnett, professor of Medieval History and former senior proctor, the University of Oxford
- Dr. Laurence Godfrey, physicist, lecturer and technical consultant/expert witness in internet-related litigation
- Lawrence Goldman, former director of the Institute of Historical Research
- I.J. Good (1916–2009), mathematician and code breaker at Bletchley Park
- Albert E. Green FRS, applied mathematician
- David Latchman CBE, master of Birkbeck, University of London
- Neil Mendoza, Provost of Oriel College, Oxford
- Peter Oppenheimer, economist
- John Rutherford, fellow in Spanish and director of the Centre for Galician Studies at The Queen's College, Oxford, translator of Don Quixote
- Simon Schama CBE, historian
- Andrew John Scott CBE, economist, principal scientist Ellison Institute of Technology Oxford & Author 100 Year Life & The Longevity Imperative
- Ian Swingland OBE DSc, Emeritus Professor, founder of the Durrell Institute of Conservation and Ecology at the University of Kent
- Adam Thirlwell, author, fellow of All Souls' College, Oxford
- John Urry, sociologist

== Musicians ==
- Erran Baron Cohen (born 1968), composer and trumpet player
- Edric Cundell (1893–1961), conductor and composer
- Isidore Godfrey (1900–1977), conductor of the D'Oyly Carte Opera Company
- Peter Perrett (born 1952), composer and lyricist for The Only Ones
- Chris Squire (1948–2015), musician in progressive rock band Yes
- Roderick Williams OBE, operatic baritone, composer and broadcaster
- Richard Wright (1943–2008), keyboardist, vocalist and songwriter in Pink Floyd

== Arts ==
- Darien Angadi (1949–1981), actor and boy soprano
- Ben Ashenden, writer, actor and comedian
- David Baddiel, comedian and novelist
- Sacha Baron Cohen, comedian (aka Ali G, Borat, or Brüno), actor, Academy Award Nominee, Golden Globe nominee, Screen Actors Guild Award nominee
- Ashley Blaker, comedian and broadcaster
- Derek Bond, Derek William Douglas Bond MC (1920–2006) was a British actor, Officer (World War II), director and playwright
- Simon Boswell, film score composer
- Peter Bradshaw, author and film critic
- Michael John Bukht, OBE (1941–2011), the "Crafty Cook" from the BBC2 television show Food and Drink who went by the name Michael Barry
- Dean Craig, film writer (Death at a Funeral)
- Paul Darrow (1941–2019), actor Blake's 7
- Roger Deakin, English writer, documentary-maker and environmentalist
- Malcolm Edwards, science fiction editor and critic
- David Elstein, founder and CEO of Channel 5 and Chairman of Opendemocracy.net
- Adam Gee, BAFTA-winning interactive media producer
- Malcolm Guite, poet, priest, singer-songwriter, currently Bye-Fellow and Chaplain of Girton College, Cambridge
- Jason Isaacs, actor, played Lucius Malfoy in the Harry Potter series
- Adam Jacobs, photographer
- Mark Kermode, film critic
- Matt Lucas, comedian, actor, writer and TV presenter
- Andrew Miller, journalist and author
- Oscar Moore, author. His partly autobiographical novel, A Matter of Life and Sex, made mention of the school.
- Jonny Persey, film producer
- A. D. Peters (1892–1973), literary agent
- Jay Rayner, food critic, author
- Jonathan Scott-Taylor, actor most notable for playling Damien Thorn in Damien: Omen II
- Sir Nicholas Serota, director of Tate Galleries (1988–present)
- Brian Sewell (1931–2015), "Britain's most famous and controversial art critic"
- William Sutcliffe, author of New Boy, a fictional book inspired by his experiences at the school
- Michael Wojas (1956–2010), owner and proprietor of The Colony Room Club in Soho, London
- Gabriel Woolf, film, radio and television actor

== Business ==
- Michael Green (born 1947) — founder of Carlton Television
- Herman Narula — co-founder and CEO of Improbable
- Sir Martin Sorrell — CEO of WPP plc (1986–2018)
- Tim Steiner — businessman, CEO of Ocado
- John Vincent — co-founder and CEO of Leon Restaurants
- Manoj Badale (born 31 December 1967) — British-Indian entrepreneur; co-founder of Blenheim Chalcot and lead owner of cricket franchise Rajasthan Royals

== Sport ==
- Myles Anderson, professional football player
- Benedict Bermange, cricket statistician
- Julian Goater, athlete
- Damon Hill OBE, F1 World Champion, racing driver
- Dilan Markanday, professional footballer
- Victor Matthews, Commonwealth (1958) and Olympic (1960) athlete, AAA Champion (1959)
- Roger Moulding, former cricketer
- David Price, former cricketer
- Michael Yeabsley, former cricketer
- Richard Yeabsley, former cricketer
- Scott Spurling, professional rugby player, U20 Eng World Cup winner 2013, Junior Commonwealth Games 7s Gold Medalist 2011

== Broadcasting ==
- Dotun Adebayo — BBC journalist and presenter of Up All Night on BBC Radio 5 Live
- Nick Goldsmith — film and TV producer
- Peter Kosminsky — writer and film director
- Zac Lichman — Big Brother UK contestant ('Ziggy') 2007 and member of boyband Northern Line
- Dan Mazer — TV producer
- Adam Parsons — BBC journalist
- Robert Popper — producer and author under the pseudonym Robin Cooper
- Matthew Price — journalist and chief correspondent for BBC Radio 4 Today programme
- Aris Roussinos — Vice News journalist
- Ian Toynton — television director, producer and editor
- David Tyler (aka David Meek) (born 1961) — TV and radio producer
- Alan Whicker CBE (1925–2013) — journalist and broadcaster

== See also ==
- Category:People educated at Haberdashers' Boys' School
