= Peter Merriman (geographer) =

British geographer and professor

Peter Merriman FAcSS FRGS FHEA FLSW
- Born: 1976 (age 49–50)

Academic background
- Education: University of Nottingham
- Thesis: M1: A Cultural Geography of an English Motorway, 1946-1965 (2002)
- Doctoral advisor: David Matless

Academic work
- Discipline: Geography
- Sub-discipline: Cultural geography; mobilities; historical geography
- Institutions: Aberystwyth University; University of Reading
- Main interests: mobilities; spatial theory; nationalism and national identity
- Notable works: Space (2022); Mobility, Space and Culture (2012); Driving Spaces: A Cultural-Historical Geography of England’s M1 Motorway (2007)
- Website: Aberystwyth University profile Official website

Peter Merriman is a British cultural geographer and historical geographer as well as a mobilities scholar.

He was educated at the University of Nottingham, where he completed a Bachelor of Arts degree in geography, and a Doctor of Philosophy degree examining the cultural and historical geographies of England’s M1 motorway, supervised by David Matless and Charles Watkins. After leaving Nottingham, he was a lecturer at the University of Reading, before joining Aberystwyth University in 2005. He is currently a Professor of Human Geography at Aberystwyth University, where he is co-founder and co-director of the Centre for Transport and Mobility (CeTraM) (with Charles Musselwhite), which was launched by Welsh Deputy Minister for Climate Change Lee Waters in 2022.

Merriman is one of the leading exponents of the interdisciplinary field of mobilities, and his work with Lynne Pearce (Lancaster) on humanities approaches to mobility and kinaesthetics inspired the establishment of international research centres at the University of Padua and Konkuk University.

From 2012 to 2020 he was associate editor of Transfers: Interdisciplinary Journal of Mobility Studies, and he has served as a member of the editorial boards of Cultural Geographies, Mobilities, Applied Mobilities, and Transfers. He is also general editor of Bloomsbury Publishing's forthcoming six-volume collection on A Cultural History of Transport and Mobility, setting the structure and commissioning the editors of this major reference work due out in 2027. Merriman was elected as a Fellow of the Academy of Social Sciences in the UK in 2022, and a Fellow of the Learned Society of Wales in 2026.

== Career ==
Merriman’s early work was grounded in the cultural landscape traditions associated with David Matless and Stephen Daniels at the University of Nottingham, where he undertook his undergraduate and postgraduate studies. His PhD was a cultural geography and cultural history of the design, landscaping, construction and use of England's M1 motorway, which was revised as his first book Driving Spaces. The book approached the landscapes of roads as dynamic entities, mobilising theoretical ideas from the new mobilities paradigm and non-representational theory to understand how people inhabited the spaces of the motorway in the late 1950s and 1960s. As part of the book, Merriman provided an in-depth critical analysis of Marc Augé’s theoretical writings on non-place, and these ideas were followed up in a series of papers and his second book Mobility, Space and Culture in 2012.

Merriman has made notable contributions to the multi-disciplinary field of mobilities, working with scholars such as Tim Cresswell, Peter Adey, David Bissell, John Urry, and Mimi Sheller. He co-edited Geographies of Mobilities with Tim Cresswell in 2011, The Routledge Handbook of Mobilities with Adey, Bissell and Sheller in 2014, Mobility and the Humanities with Lynne Pearce in 2018, and co-authored the trilingual open access book Connections: Arts and Humanities for Just Mobility Futures with Peter Adey, Jinhyoung Lee, Lynne Pearce, Vernoica Della Dora, Sasha Engelmann, Simone Gigliotti, Harriet Hawkins, Giada Peterle and Tania Rossetto.

In 2022 Merriman’s book Space was published in Routledge's Key Ideas in Geography aeries. This advanced text provided a critical analysis of how space has been theorised in Western thought, from traditions of mathematics, physics and philosophy, through to contemporary thinking in the social sciences and humanities. It claimed to be "the first accessible text which provides a comprehensive examination of approaches that have crossed between such diverse fields as philosophy, physics, architecture, sociology, anthropology, and geography".

He was awarded a Leverhulme Fellowship for 2025-26 to write a book on Wales and the 1951 Festival of Britain.

== Selected publications ==
=== Books ===
- Driving Spaces: A Cultural-Historical Geography of England’s M1 Motorway (Blackwell's, Royal Geographical Society Book Series, 2007)
- Mobility, Space and Culture (Routledge, International Library of Sociology book series, 2012)
- Space (Routledge, Key Ideas in Geography Series, 2022)
- Connections: Arts and Humanities for Just Mobility Futures (co-authored, Seoul: LP Publications, open access)

=== Edited books ===
- Geographies of Mobilities: Practices, Spaces, Subjects, edited with Tim Cresswell (Ashgate Publishing, 2011)
- The Routledge Handbook of Mobilities, edited with Peter Adey, David Bissell, Kevin Hannam and Mimi Sheller (Routledge, 2014)
- Space – Critical Concepts in Geography (Volumes I-IV, Routledge, 2016)
  - Volume I: Foundational Texts
  - Volume II: Productions: Socialities, Politics, Structures
  - Volume III: Inhabiting: Bodies, Subjects and Positions
  - Volume IV: Vibrant Spaces: Process, Materiality, Creativity
- Mobility and the Humanities, edited with Lynne Pearce (Routledge, 2018)
- Empire and Mobility in the Long Nineteenth Century, edited with David Lambert (Manchester University Press, Studies in Imperialism, 2020)
- Ports, Past and Present: Stories of the Irish Sea, edited with Rita Singer and Rhys Jones (Aberystwyth University, 2023)
- The Routledge Handbook of Cultural Geographies, edited with Anna Secor and Shanti Sumartojo (Routledge, 2026)

=== Key journal articles ===
On space, place and movement:

- Human geography without time-space, Transactions of the Institute of British Geographers (2012)
- Space and spatiality in theory (with Martin Jones, Gunnar Olsson, Eric Sheppard, Nigel Thrift and Yi-Fu Tuan) Dialogues in Human Geography (2012)
- Crystallising Places: Towards geographies of ontogenesis and individuation, Progress in Human Geography (2023)

Mobilities and mobile methods:

- Rethinking mobile methods, Mobilities (2014)
- Mobility and the humanities (with Lynne Pearce), Mobilities (2017)
- Molar and molecular mobilities: the politics of perceptible and imperceptible movements, Environment and Planning D: Society and Space (2019)
- Mobility/fixity: Rethinking binaries in mobility studies, Mobility Humanities (2023)

On Marc Augé:

- Driving places: Marc Augé, non-places and the geographies of England's M1 motorway, Theory, Culture, and Society (2004)
- Marc Augé on space, place and non-place, Irish Journal of French Studies (2009)

On nations, nationalism and national identity:

- Hot, banal and everyday nationalism: bilingual road signs in Wales (with Rhys Jones), Political Geography (2009)
- “Symbols of Justice”: the Welsh Language Society’s campaign for bilingual road signs in Wales, 1967-1980 (with Rhys Jones), Journal of Historical Geography (2009)
- Network nation (with Rhys Jones), Environment and Planning A (2012)
- Nations, materialities and affects (with Rhys Jones), Progress in Human Geography (2017)
- The spaces and politics of affective nationalism (with Marco Antonsich, Michael Skey, Angharad Closs Stephens, Divya Tolia-Kelly, Helen Wilson and Ben Anderson), Environmental and Politics C: Politics and Space (2020)
