= Yeabsley =

Yeabsley is a surname of English origin. People with that name include:

- Bert Yeabsley (1893–1961), American baseball and football player
- Doug Yeabsley (born 1942), English cricketer, father of Michael and Richard
- Michael Yeabsley (born 1972), English former first-class cricketer, son of Doug
- Richard Yeabsley (born 1973), English former first-class cricketer, son of Doug
