= Simon Shaps =

British television executive and producer

- Born: 10 September 1956 (age 69); England
- Education: Magdalene College, Cambridge
- Occupations: Television executive, television producer, former reporter
- Employer(s): Thames Television, Granada Television, ITV

Simon Shaps (born 10 September 1956) is a British television executive and producer, and former ITV director of television.

== Early life and career ==
Shaps attended Haberdashers' Aske's Boys' School in Elstree, Hertfordshire and studied English at Magdalene College, Cambridge.

He began his career as a reporter on the Cambridge Evening News in 1979; in a speech to the Royal Television Society (RTS), he described this time as "a two-year stint in Siberia".

In 1982, he joined Thames Television as a researcher, having been turned down by the BBC for a job as a graduate trainee. As a television producer he produced Strange but True? and The One That Got Away.

In 1997, he became director of programmes at Granada Television in Manchester. In 2001 he became managing director of Granada content. In November 2003 he became chief executive of Granada Television.

He became ITV director of television on 21 September 2005, leaving in 2008. Under his leadership, ITV revived its programme line-up, unceremoniously dispensing with many long-running programmes. His cancellation of Foyle's War was speedily reversed given its viewing figures and popularity.

== Personal life ==
He is married with three children.

== See also ==
- List of Old Haberdashers

Media offices
Preceded by	ITV Director of Television; September 2005- February 2008	Succeeded by Peter Fincham
