= Marc Lee =

Swiss new media artist

- Born: March 17, 1969 (age 57); Knutwil, Canton of Lucerne, Switzerland
- Education: Zurich University of the Arts, Basel University of the Arts
- Known for: Artist, New media art
- Notable work: Loogie.net, Open News Network, Breaking the news, 10'000 moving cities, Realtime stories, Pic-Me
- Movement: Performance and Interactive Media Arts
- Awards: Social Media Art Award and Transmediale Awards in the categories "Interaction" and "Software"
- Website: http://marclee.io

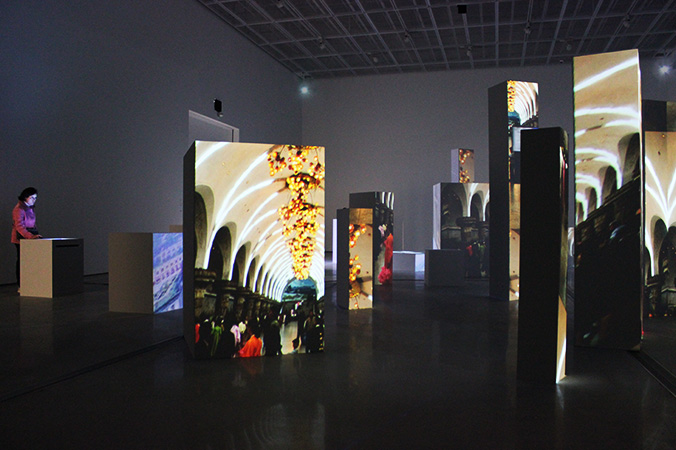
10.000 Moving Cities, 2013, National Museum of Modern and Contemporary Art, Seoul, Korea

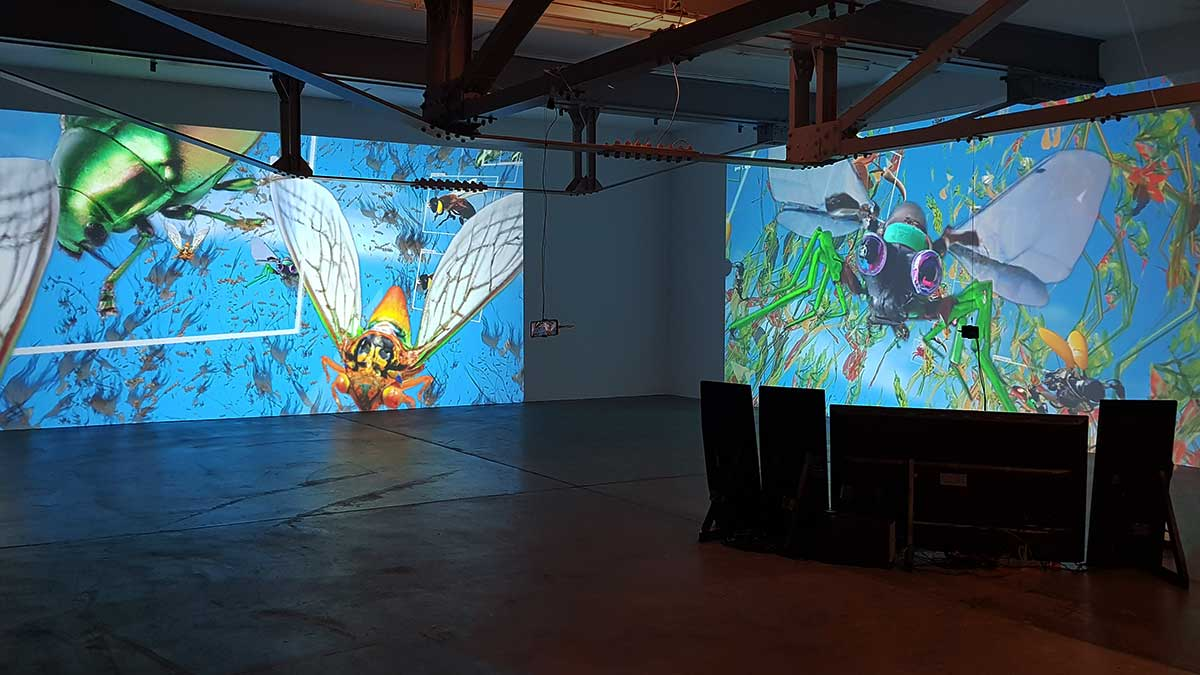
Speculative Evolution, 2024, Kunsthalle Schaffhausen, Switzerland

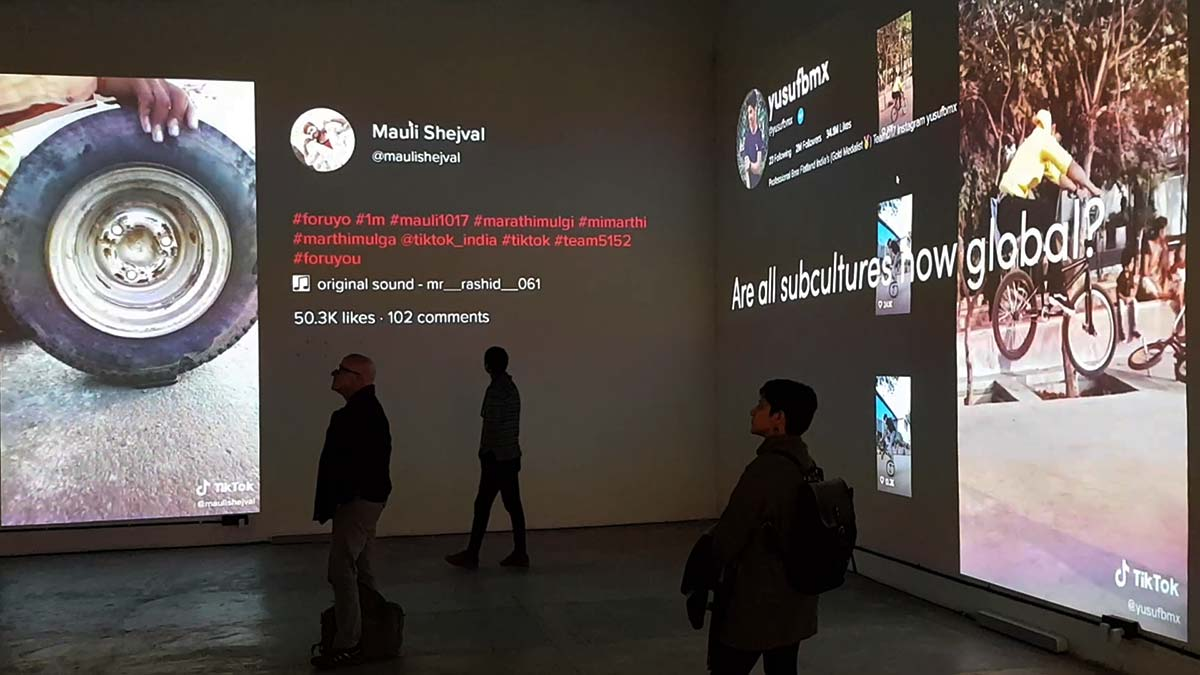
Unfiltered – Tiktok and the Emerging Face of Culture, 2020, SPACE10, India Art Fair New Delhi

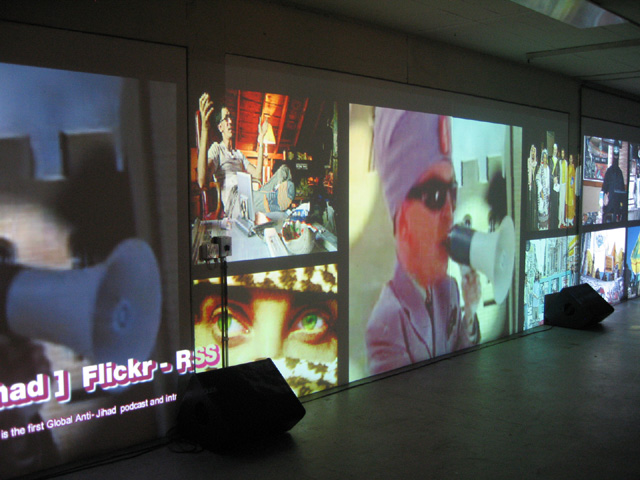
Breaking The News, 2007, Dock 18, Zürich, Switzerland

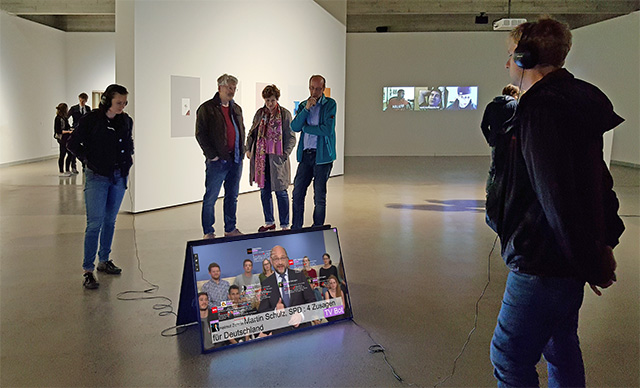
TV Bot, 2017, Port25, Mannheim, Germany

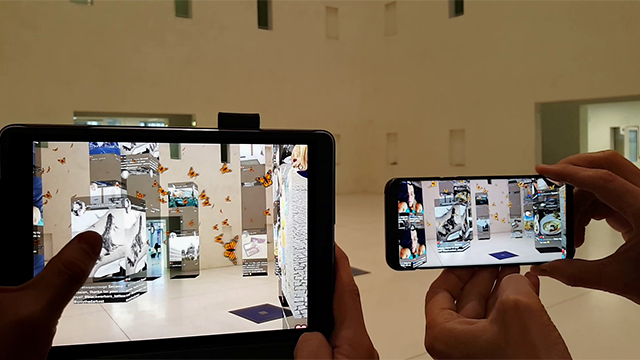
10.000 Moving Cities, Augmented Reality, 2018, Stadtbibliothek, Stuttgart, Germany

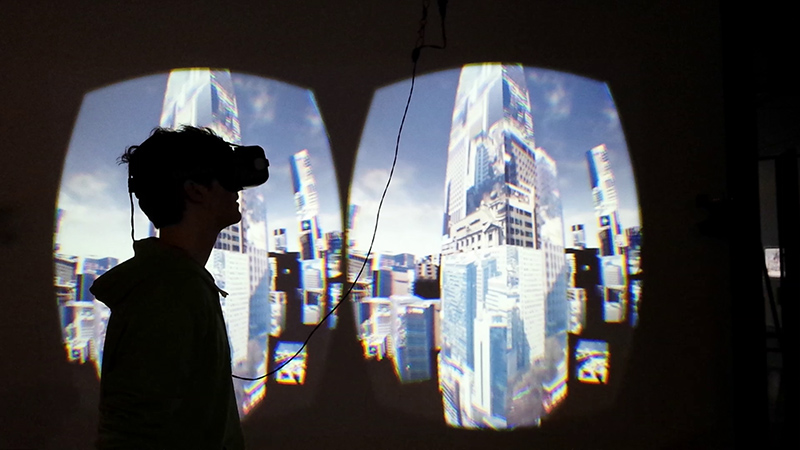
10.000 Moving Cities, Virtual Reality, 2015, ZKM, Karlsruhe, Germany

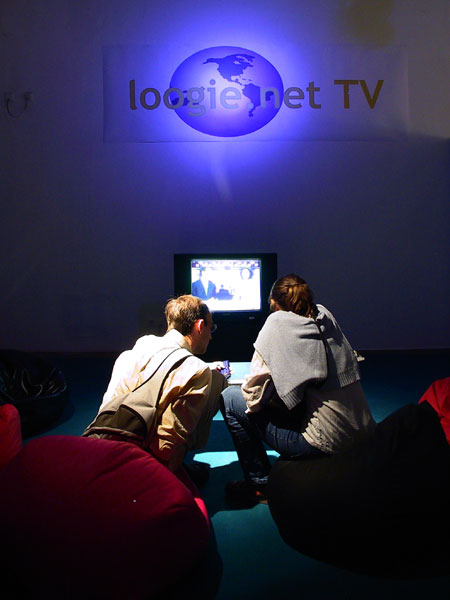
Loogie.net TV, 2004, Ars Electronica, Linz, Austria

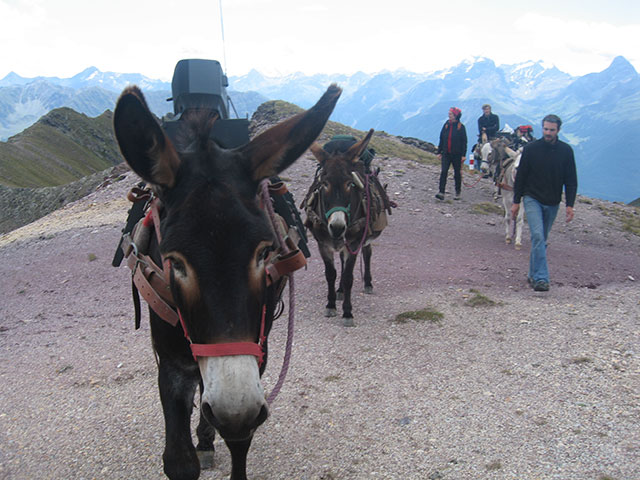
Media Donkeys, 2011, Martüel, Switzerland

Marc Lee (born March 17, 1969) is a Swiss new media artist working in the fields of interactive installation art, internet art, performance art and video art.

== Biography ==
Lee was born in 1969 in Knutwil, Lucerne, in Switzerland. He studied at the Basel University of Art and Design installation and at the Zurich University of the Arts new media art through 2003.

Lee creates network-oriented interactive projects since 1999. He is experimenting with information and communication technologies. His projects locate and critically discuss economic, political, cultural and creative issues. His artworks reflect the visions and limits of our information society in an intelligent and artistic manner.

Marc Lee has exhibited in major art exhibitions including: ZKM Karlsruhe, New Museum New York, Transmediale Berlin, Ars Electronica Linz, Contemporary Art Biennale Sevilla, Media Art Biennale Seoul, Viper and Shift Festival Basel, Read_Me Festival Moskau, CeC Delhi, MoMA Shanghai, ICC Tokyo and National Museum of Modern and Contemporary Art Seoul.

Lee's work are in private and public collections including the Federal Art Collection Switzerland and the ZKM Karlsruhe and he has won many prices and honorary mentions at international festivals, including Transmediale Berlin and Ars Electronica Linz

== Art projects ==
- 10.000 Moving Cities – Same but Different explores how our planet is becoming increasingly homogeneous and how globalization creates more and more “places without a local identity” – as described in Marc Augé’s essay Non-place (1992). In 10.000 Moving Cities all cities have the identical buildings, but the information on the building facades are constantly different. They are searched in real time on social networks about the chosen location. This ongoing experimental research project is developed by Marc Lee in collaboration with Intelligent Sensor-Actuator-Systems Laboratory (ISAS) at the Karlsruhe Institute of Technology and the ZKM Center for Art and Media Karlsruhe. Four versions have been created so far: augmented reality (AR) version, virtual reality (VR) version, mobile app version, and a "real cubes" version. These versions are technologically very different but address the identical topic. A large-scale exhibition was at the premiere exhibition Connecting_Unfolding of the National Museum of Modern and Contemporary Art Seoul.
- Unfiltered – TikTok and the Emerging Face of Culture is an immersive installation. It explores the influence of digital accessibility and questioning its impact on public consciousness, visual aesthetics and identity structures. With the increasing access to social media, digital hierarchies are being broken. Platforms like TikTok are the new city town hall, whose "influence" is no longer limited to the urban elite.
- Echolocation – Mapping the Free Flow of Information Around the World in Realtime deals with cultural diversity and at the same time with the powerful homogenization. It poses questions about the meaning of our culture which is becoming increasingly similar. In Echolocation, stories posted on social networks like YouTube, Flickr and Twitter can be searched in real time about self chosen location.
- Corona TV Bot is current version of Marc Lee’s TV bot, an ongoing project started in 2004, filters the latest Twitter and YouTube posts according to self-definable keywords or hashtags. In response to the coronavirus pandemic, the latest Twitter and YouTube posts about COVID-19 and Coronavirus are mediated in a wild continuous TV show feed and reflect the coronavirus pandemic 24/7 online. Since the Corona virus pandemic, 6-hour broadcasts are recorded every week. These resources can be compared in a chronological order to make cultural, economic and political factors, differences, development and change tangible.
- 360° VR Mobile Art Apps are research projects for interactive art installations. Visitors can interact using smartphones or tablets and become performers. The mobile display is projected on one or more walls in the exhibition space. The sonic sound experiences are specially composed for the apps and respond to movements and navigation modes.
- Political Campaigns – Battle of Opinion on Social Media In political campaigns around the world, supporters of opposing parties have engaged in heated battles on social media. "Political Campaigns" filters the latest Twitter, Instagram, and YouTube posts, which include search terms of top candidates or parties, and weaves them into a wild TV news show (24/7). What counts today are likes and retweets, which travel across the screen fighting for victory and indicate their current online market value. A network-based TV show that confronts us with opinions that don't reflect just variants of our own.
- Pic-Me – Fly to the Locations Where Users Send Posts With Pic-Me you can virtually fly to the places from where users send posts to Instagram, thus offering another view on how the media handles posts on social networks. This work makes us think what happens to the huge amounts of data generated by humans and collected by institutions worldwide?
- Loogie.net generates television news programs on self-made topics at the push of a button. The first founded "interactive news television station" in 2003. This research project is a TV news channel, media satire and art installation at the same time.
- Breaking the News – Be a News-Jockey Information on self-made topics are transmitted in real time from the internet and audiovisualized on four large projections. The user becomes a live performer, a news jockey. About News-Jockey:
  Friends ask: Could you help me to cook up a news that I'll like? Those questions often evolved into great conversations. Friends told us their favorite headlines, and we in turn created new stories. Everybody started joking that we were now their personal News-Jockeys. We created NJ so that we can have that same kind of conversation with you.
  — Marc Lee, RHIZOME
- Used to be my home too cartographs in real-time our rich biodiversity and at the same time the continuous extinction of species. This experiment shows photos of plants, fungi and animals that are uploaded right now by unknown users to iNaturalist.org via mobile phone. These are mapped on Google Earth at the exact location where they were photographed. In addition, taxonomically similar species that occurred in the same country and became extinct within the last 30 years are assigned in real time via RedList.org.
- YANTO – yaw and not tip over is a speculative simulation on the future of aquafarming that questions the limitations of techno-solutionist approaches to species depletion and climate collapse, such as genetic engineering, synthetic biology and artificial intelligence. The narrative sets in a speculative environment where AI and synthetic biology work together to create an optimized environment for farmed species. A simulator powered by AI creates hybrid species to balance a delicate ecosystem.
- Speculative Evolution imagines a speculative ecosystem 30 years from now, where artificial intelligence and biotechnologies work together to create and optimize species to withstand the increasingly hostile environment. From the perspective of an AI agent, the audiences are invited to create new variations of animals, fungi, plants, and robots, fly with these engineered and mutated species, and observe the changing ecosystem.
- Losing Oneself – Voices from the Deep Sea is an interactive, web-based installation. The project envisions a speculative reversal in which deep-sea organisms reuse human AI to observe human behavior from the depths. A synthetic swarm reacts in real time, reflecting human behaviors, contradictions, and vulnerabilities. Artificial intelligence is understood as a relational agent. The work explores collective consciousness and swarm intelligence and frames coexistence not as a system of extraction, but as a practice rooted in ecological care, interdependence, and equality.

== Exhibitions (selection) ==
- 2023 – Transmediale Festival, Akademie der Künste, Berlin, Germany
- 2022 – Swiss Media Art - Pax Art Awards, HEK (Haus der Elektronischen Künste), Basel, Switzerland
- 2017–2018 – Aestetic of Changes, MAK - 150 Years of the University of Applied Arts Vienna, Austria
- 2013 – Connecting_Unfolding, MMCA - National Museum of Modern and Contemporary Art, Seoul, Korea
- 2004–2008 – Loogie.net Algorithmic Revolution, ZKM Medienmuseum, Karlsruhe, Germany
- 2002 – Open\\_Source\\_Art\\_Hack, New Museum, New York, USA

== Publications ==
- 2022 - ESCH, ZKM Karlsruhe, Hacking Identity – Dancing Diversity
- 2020 – post-futuristisch, KUNSTFORUM International Bd. 267, Magazine
- 2019 – LUX AETERNA - ISEA 2019 Art, Catalogue
- 2019 – xCoAx 2019: Proceedings of the Seventh Conference on Computation, Communication, Aesthetics and X
- 2019 – FILE SÃO PAULO 2019: 20 Years of FILE 20 Years of Art and Technology (ISBN 9788589730297)
- 2019 – Research TECHNOLOGY URBANITY, Schafhof - European Center for Art Upper Bavaria
- 2017 – THE UNFRAMED WORLD, Virtual Reality as Artistic Medium, Sabine Himmelsbach(ISBN 978-3-85616-850-6)
- 2014 – Inauguration, National Museum of Modern and Contemporary Art, Korea (ISBN 978-89-6303-069-2)
- 2010 – Was tun. Figuren des Protests. Taktiken des Widerstands (ISBN 3-99014-014-0)
- 2008 – Digital Playground 2008, "Hack the City!" (ISBN 978-89-961789-0-3)
- 2004 – Read_me: Software Art & Cultures, Aarhus (ISBN 978-87-988440-4-4)
- 2004 – MetaWorx – Young Swiss Interactive. Approaches to Interactivity (ISBN 3-7643-0089-2)
- 2004 – 56kTV - bastard channel MAGAZIN
