= Jamie Hewitt (cricketer) =

English cricketer (born 1976)

Personal information
- Full name: James Peter Hewitt
- Born: 26 February 1976 (age 50); Southwark, London
- Height: 6 ft 3 in (1.91 m)
- Batting: Left-handed
- Bowling: Right-arm medium fast
- Role: Allrounder

Domestic team information
- Years: Team
- 1996–2001: Middlesex
- 2002–2003: Kent
- 2005–2008: Oxfordshire
- 2009–2012: Hertfordshire
- 2013–2014: Bedfordshire
- FC debut: 20 April 1996 Middlesex v Oxford Univ
- Last FC: 19 April 2002 Kent v Hampshire
- LA debut: 27 August 1995 Middlesex v Yorkshire
- Last LA: 28 May 2003 Kent v Gloucestershire

Career statistics
Competition	First-class	List A
Matches	61	81
Runs scored	1,264	335
Batting average	18.31	11.16
100s/50s	0/3	0/0
Top score	75	32*
Balls bowled	8,485	3,135
Wickets	170	72
Bowling average	29.10	33.77
5 wickets in innings	5	0
10 wickets in match	0	0
Best bowling	6/14	4/24
Catches/stumpings	23/–	24/–
- Source: CricInfo, 3 November 2017

James Peter Hewitt (born 1976), known as Jamie Hewitt, is a former English professional cricketer. He played county cricket for Middlesex County Cricket Club and Kent County Cricket Club between 1995 and 2003 and later played minor counties cricket, as a seam bowling all-rounder. He was born in Southwark in London in 1976 and was educated at Richmond upon Thames College, Kingston College and City of Westminster College.

== Cricket career ==
Hewitt played for Middlesex's Second XI from 1994 before making his senior debut for the club in the Sunday League. He went on to make his first-class cricket debut in April 1996 against Oxford University at the University Parks. He made his County Championship debut against Gloucestershire in May of the same year, taking a wicket with his first ball. Hewitt went on to play in over 130 senior matches for Middlesex and was awarded his county cap in 1998. He was considered a "richly promising seamer" and took 60 wickets for the county in 1997, although his bowling form was thought to have "declined alarmingly" after 1998.

Injuries and issues with confidence reduced his effectiveness and in 2000 he did not play at all for Middlesex. He took 170 first-class wickets for the county, his finest moment was taking 6/14 when he and Angus Fraser bowled out Glamorgan for 31 all out at Sophia Gardens in 1997.

Before the start of the 2001 season Hewitt was approached by Kent County Cricket Club with a view to him joining the club on a three-year contract. This was deemed to be an illegal approach and Kent were later fined. At the end of the 2001 season Hewitt did join Kent on a two-year contract, playing for the county during 2002 and 2003. He made only six senior appearances for the county before being released during the 2003 season.

== Coaching career ==
After leaving Kent, Hewitt was player-coach for Oxfordshire between 2005 and 2008, Hertfordshire from 2009 to 2012 and Bedfordshire during 2013 and 2014. He set up his own coaching academy, is an ECB Level 4 coach and has been Performance Coach and Head of Development for Hertfordshire. In 2014 he began working at Haberdashers' Aske's Boys' School in London coaching cricket and building partnerships between Middlesex and the school. As of August 2017 he remained in this role.
