= Spatial turn =

Intellectual movement emphasizing place and space

Spatial turn is an intellectual movement that places emphasis on place and space in social science and the humanities. It is closely linked with quantitative studies of history, literature, cartography, geography, and other studies of society. The movement has been influential in providing and analyzing mass amounts of spatial data for study of cultures, regions, and specific locations. An important aspect is the realisation that the spatial environment not only provides a physical background for historical and social developments, but also helps to shape them. According to this understanding, spaces are also constructed through social interactions and also shape these in turn.

== History ==
Academics such as German philosopher Ernst Cassirer and American historian Lewis Mumford helped to define a sense of "community" and "commons" in their studies, forming the first part of a "spatial turn." The turn developed more comprehensively in the later 20th century in French academic theories, such as those of Michel de Certeau, Michel Foucault, and Henri Lefebvre.

Technologies have also played an important role in "turns." The introduction of Geographic Information Systems (GIS) has also been instrumental in quantifying data in the humanities for study by its place. In the 21st century, the increasing availability of smaller scale geographic data tracking individuals through mobile phones has led the spatial turn to spawn the mobilities turn which focuses on the movement of people, ideas, and things through space.

== Bibliography ==
- Berti, Irene (2024). "Der spatial turn in den klassischen Altertumswissenschaften (und speziell in der Epigraphik)". Journal of Ancient Civilizations. 39 (1): 99–121.
