= John Urry (sociologist) =

British sociologist (1946–2016)

John Urry FAcSS
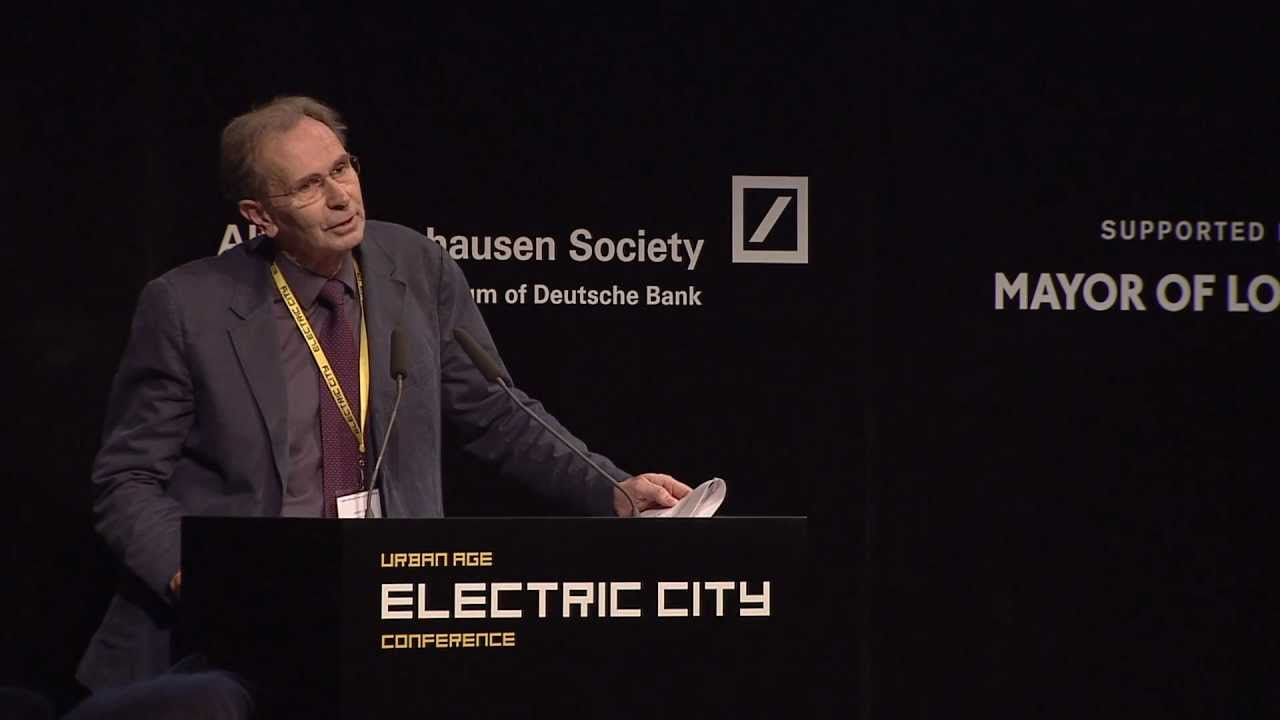
- John Urry in 2013.
- Born: 1 June 1946; London, United Kingdom
- Died: 18 March 2016 (aged 69); Lancaster, United Kingdom
- Spouse: Sylvia Walby

Academic background
- Education: Christ's College, Cambridge (BA, PhD)

Academic work
- Discipline: Sociologist
- Institutions: Lancaster University

John Richard Urry FAcSS (/ˈʊəri/; 1 June 1946, London – 18 March 2016, Lancaster) was a British sociologist who served as a professor at Lancaster University. He is noted for work in the fields of the sociology of tourism and mobility.

He wrote books on many other aspects of modern society including the transition away from "organised capitalism", the sociology of nature and environmentalism, and social theory in general.

== Background ==
Born in London and educated at the Haberdashers' Aske's Boys' School, Urry gained his first degrees from Christ's College, Cambridge in 1967, a 'double first' BA and MA in Economics, before going on to gain his PhD in Sociology from the same institution in 1972. He arrived at Lancaster University Sociology department as a lecturer in 1970, becoming head of department in 1983 and a professor in 1985.

Urry was a Fellow of the Royal Society of Arts, a Founding Academician of the UK Academy of Learned Societies for the Social Sciences, and was a visiting professor at both Bristol and Roskilde Geography Departments.

His partner was the sociologist Sylvia Walby.

== Research interests ==
His original research interests were in the sociology of power and revolution and this resulted in the publication of Reference Groups and the Theory of Revolution (1973) and Power in Britain (1973).

Early work at Lancaster was in the area of social theory and the philosophy of the social sciences. Social Theory as Science, (1975, 1982), co-written with his colleague Russell Keat, set out the main features of the realist philosophy of science. Critical confrontation with a number of Marxist traditions, of Althusserian structuralism, German state theory, and neo-Gramscian theory, resulted in the Anatomy of Capitalist Societies (1981).

== Research areas ==
Research until his death focused on five main areas.

=== Regionalism ===
First, there was the urban and regional research mainly associated with the Lancaster Regionalism Group. Collaborative research resulted in Localities, Class and Gender (1985) and Restructuring. Place, Class and Gender (1990) Two particular themes were pursued: the relationship between society and space (as in the Social Relations and Spatial Structures, co-edited with Derek Gregory, 1985); and the possibilities of developing local economic policies (as in Place, Policy and Politics, 1990).

=== Economic and social change ===
The second area of research was the more general dimensions of economic and social change in western capitalist societies. This resulted in three jointly written books, Capital, Labour and the Middle Classes (1983); The End of Organized Capitalism (1987); and Economies of Signs and Space (1994; latter two with Scott Lash).

=== Consumer and tourism services ===
Thirdly, research focused upon one particular set of industries that are of particular significance in contemporary western societies, namely consumer services and especially tourist-related services. The economic, social, environmental and cultural implications of such developments can be seen in The Tourist Gaze (1990, 2002: 2nd edn.), Consuming Places (1995), Touring Cultures (1997, edited with Chris Rojek), Tourism Mobilities (2004, edited with Mimi Sheller), and Performing Tourist Places (with J-O Barenholdt, M Haldrup, J. Larsen). This concern was extended to issues of environmental change and the 'sociology of nature' see Contested Natures (1998), Bodies of Nature (2001) (both with Phil Macnaghten) and Climate Change and Society (2011).

=== Mobility ===
Fourthly, Urry had various research projects and publications relating to the changing nature of mobility. Publications include: Sociology Beyond Societies (2000), a special issue of Theory, Culture and Society, (August 2004 on Automobilities coedited with Mike Feathersone, Nigel Thrift); Mobile Technologies of the city (2006); coedited with Mimi Sheller. John Urry also directed the Centre for Mobilities Research between 2003 and 2015 and was later the co-director of the Institute for Social Futures.

=== Complexity theory ===
Finally, John Urry had been exploring some implications of complexity theory for the social sciences. Publications here include Global Complexity (2003), and "Complexity", a special double issue of Theory, Culture & Society (2005).

He was also one of the founding editors of the new journal Mobilities, and served as editor of the International Library of Sociology since 1990 (Routledge).

== Books published ==
(excluding foreign language editions; books translated into 10+ languages)

- 1973
  - Reference Groups and the Theory of Revolution, Routledge and Kegan Paul
  - Power in Britain, Heinemann Education (co edited with John Wakeford)
- 1975 Social Theory as Science, Routledge and Kegan Paul (with Russell Keat)
- 1981 The Anatomy of Capitalist Societies, Macmillan
- 1982 Social Theory as Science, Second Edition, Routledge and Kegan Paul (with Russell Keat)
- 1983 Capital, Labour and the Middle Classes, Allen and Unwin (with Nick Abercrombie)
- 1985
  - Social Relations and Spatial Structures, Macmillan (co edited with Derek Gregory)
  - Localities, Class, and Gender, Pion (with Lancaster Regionalism Group)
- 1987 The End of Organized Capitalism, Polity (with Scott Lash)
- 1988 Contemporary British Society, Polity (with Nick Abercrombie, Alan Warde, Keith Soothill, Sylvia Walby).
- 1989–96 Schools of Thought in Sociology, General Editor of 18 vols, Edward Elgar.
- 1990
  - Localities, Policies, Politics. Do Localities Matter?, Hutchinson (co edited with Michael Harloe, Chris Pickvance).
  - Restructuring. Place, Class and Gender, Sage (with other members of the Lancaster Regionalism Group).
  - The Tourist Gaze, Sage.
- 1994
  - Economies of Signs and Space, Sage (with Scott Lash)
  - Contemporary British Society, Second Edition, Polity (with Nick Abercrombie, Alan Warde, Keith Soothill, Sylvia Walby)
  - Leisure Landscapes, Main Report and Background Papers, CPRE (with Gordon Clark, Jan Darrall, Robin Grove-White, Phil Macnaghten)
- 1995 Consuming Places, Routledge
- 1997 Touring Cultures, Routledge (co edited with Chris Rojek)
- 1998 Contested Natures, Sage (with Phil Macnaghten)
- 2000
  - "Sociology for the New Millennium." Special issue of the British Journal of Sociology (commissioned: contributors include Castells, Wallerstein, Beck, Sassen, Therborn)
  - Sociology beyond Societies, Routledge
  - Contemporary British Society, Third Edition, Polity (with Nick Abercrombie, Alan Warde et al.)
  - "Bodies of Nature". Special issue of Body and Society 6 (commissioned: co edited with Phil Macnaghten)
- 2001 Bodies of Nature. Sage (co edited with Phil Macnaghten)
- 2002 The Tourist Gaze. Second Edition, London: Sage
- 2003 Global Complexity, Cambridge: Polity
- 2004
  - "Presence-Absence." Special issue of Environment and Planning A: Society and Space 22 (co edited with Michel Callon and John Law)
  - "Automobilities." Special issue of Theory, Culture and Society 21 (co edited with Mike Featherstone and Nigel Thrift)
  - Tourism Mobilities. Places to Play, Places in Play, Routledge (co edited with Mimi Sheller)
  - Performing Tourist Places, Ashgate (with Bærenholdt, J. O., Haldrup, M., Larsen, J.)
- 2005
  - "Complexity." Special Issue of Theory, Culture and Society 22 1- 270
  - Automobilities. London: Sage (co edited with Featherstone, M., Thrift, N.) 285 pp.
  - Sociologie de Mobilités: Une nouvelle frontiére pour la sociologie?, Paris, Armand Colin, 251pp.
- 2006
  1. "Mobilities and Materialities." Special issue of Environment and Planning A (co-edited with M. Sheller)
  2. Mobile Technologies of the City, London: Routledge (coedited with M. Sheller)
  3. Mobilities, Geographies, Networks, London: Ashgate (with J. Larsen, K.Axhausen)
- 2007 Mobilities, Cambridge: Polity
- 2010 Mobile Lives, London: Routledge (with Anthony Elliott)
- 2011 Climate Change and Society, Cambridge: Polity
- 2013 Societies Beyond Oil, London: Zed
- 2014 Offshoring, Cambridge: Polity
- 2016 What is the Future?, Cambridge: Polity
