= John Lust =

John Lust (25 September, 1918, Islington - 30 June, 2000) was a prominent librarian at London's School of Oriental and African Studies (SOAS). The son of a Jewish tailor, John attended Haberdashers Askes School and served with the Royal Artillery during the World War II. Then he took a degree in French at University College, London before taking up the post of assistant librarian in the far eastern section of SOAS library.

His book, Western Books On China Published Up To 1850 contains 654 collection of China from Western sources prior to 1850.

== Works ==
- Index Sinicus (1964)
- Western Books On China Published Up To 1850 (1987)
- Chinese Popular Prints (1966)
