= Aldenham House =

Country house in Aldenham, Hertfordshire, England

Coordinates: 51°39′25″N 00°18′44″W

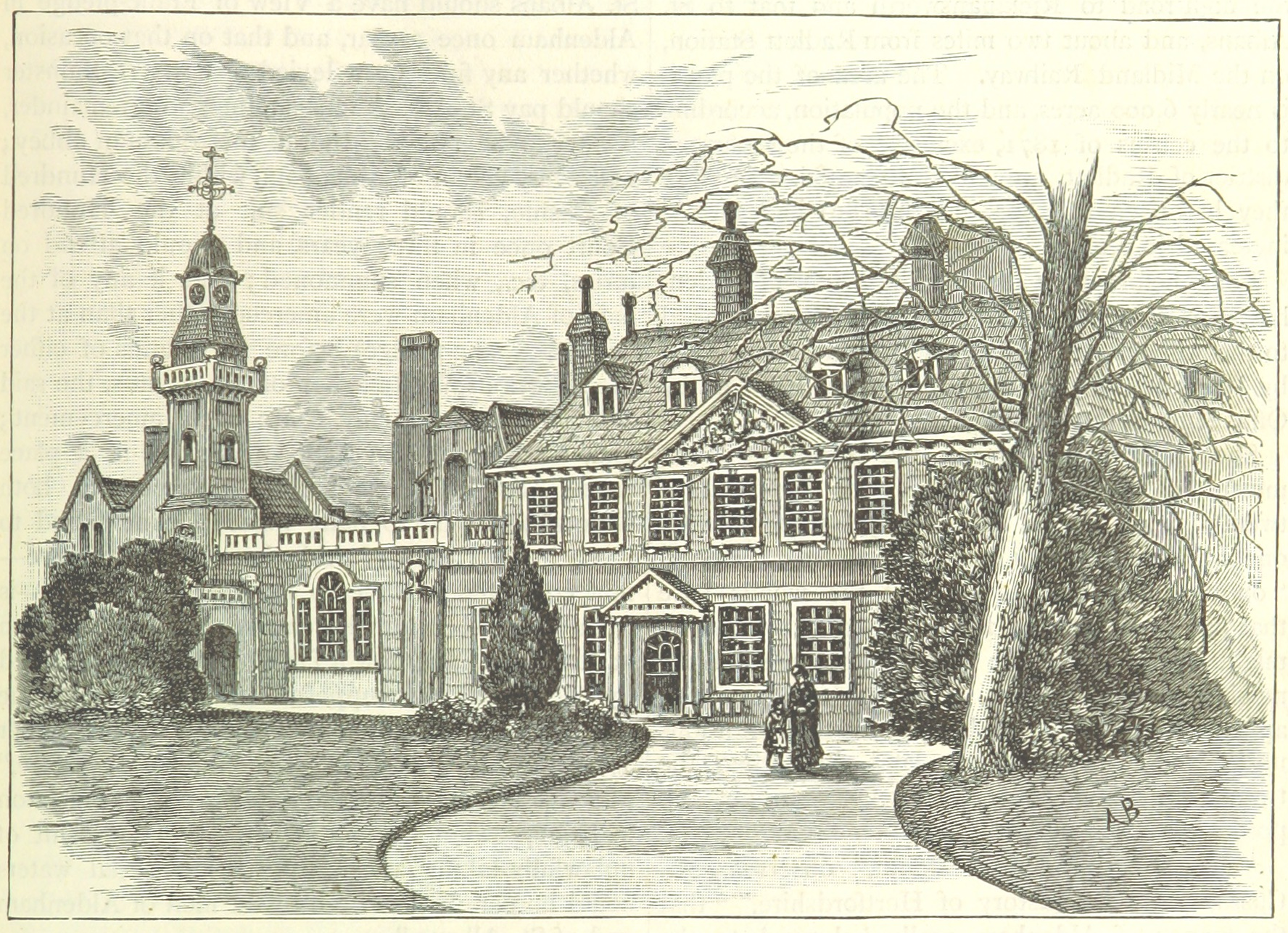
Aldenham House in 1882

Aldenham House is an English country house in Elstree, just south-east of Aldenham village and west of Borehamwood, Hertfordshire, England. It was the seat of the Gibbs family, who were the Barons Aldenham, and is now a main building of the Haberdashers' Boys' School, while its estate accommodates the other school buildings, the Haberdashers' School for Girls, the Lister Institute, and the Hilfield Reservoir.

The house was built about 1672 for H. Coghill the Younger and was acquired, renovated and extended about 1870 by Hucks Gibbs, 1st Baron Aldenham. In 1932, the estate was sold after the death of its then occupant Vicary Gibbs, a financier, former member of parliament, and avid plant collector who had amassed a larger collection of Chinese flora than the Royal Botanic Gardens Kew. Gibbs never married, and most of the plant collection was auctioned after his death.

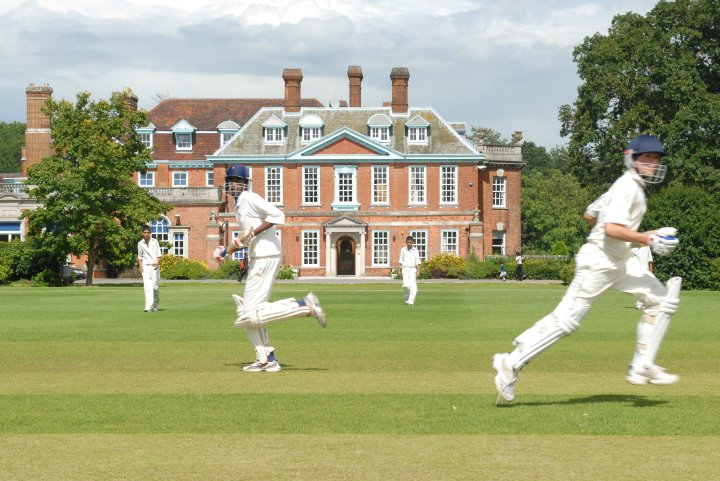
School cricket in front of the house

The house and grounds became a country club until the Second World War, when it was requisitioned by the BBC for use as an overseas broadcasting station. After the war the house stood empty until occupied by the Haberdashers' Boys' School in 1961. While building works for the new school were in progress, MGM shot Village of the Damned (1960 film) in front of the house and the 'carry-on' style film Kill or Cure in the entrance hall and on the front lawn. The frontage and grounds have since appeared in a number of episodes of several 1960s television programmes including The Avengers and The Saint.

Aldenham House is a Grade II* listed building.
