= Sylvia Walby =

British sociologist (born 1953)

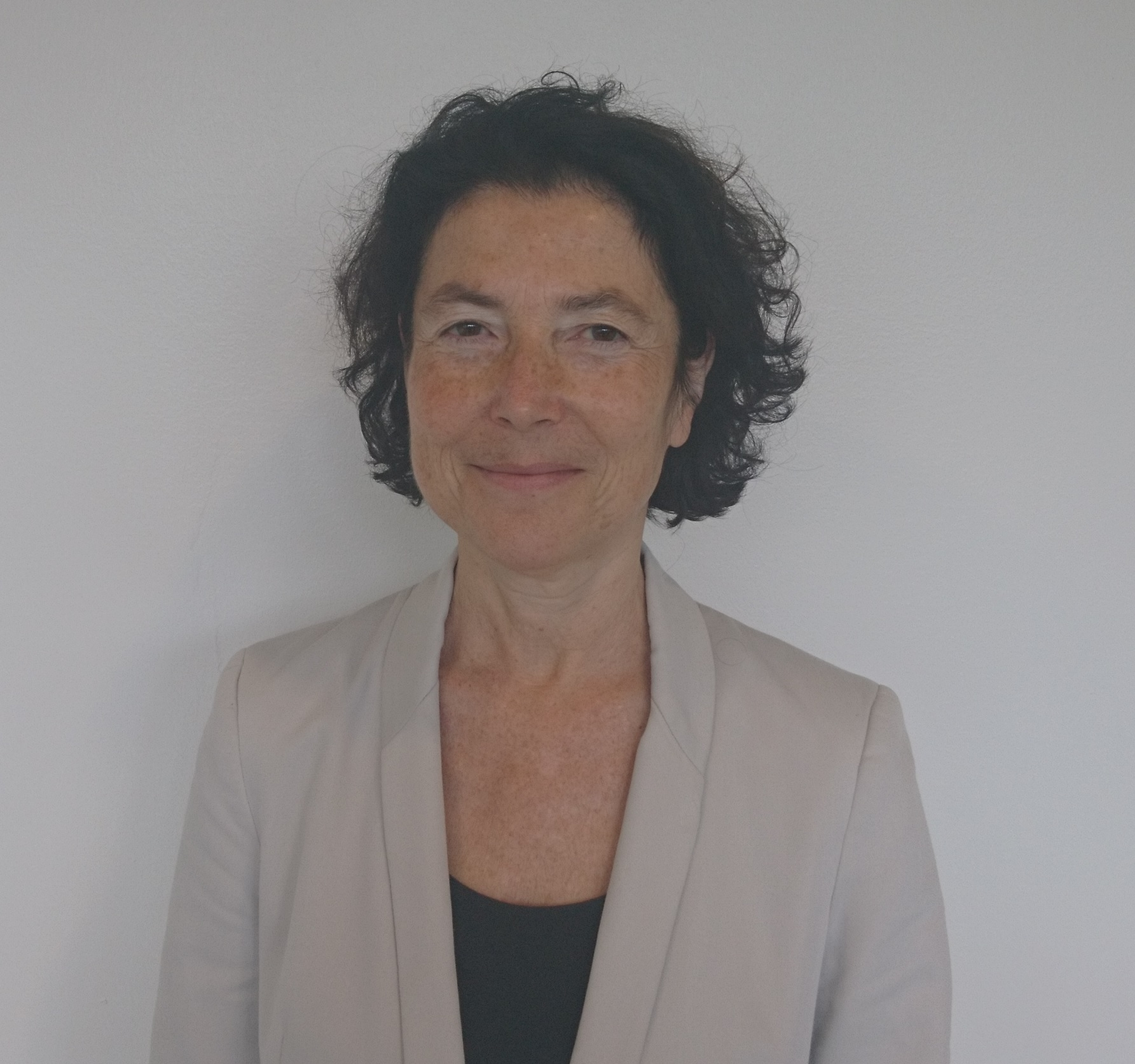
- Born: Sylvia Theresa Walby
- Known for: domestic violence, patriarchy, globalisation
- Scientific career
- Fields: Sociologist, Criminologist
- Workplaces: Royal Holloway, University of London
- Website: Official website

Sylvia Walby OBE FBA FAcSS is Professor in the School of Law and Social Sciences at Royal Holloway University of London. She is a sociologist and social scientist known for her work in social and complexity theory, gender regimes and patriarchy, violence and society - including domestic violence and human trafficking - gender relations in the workplace, and globalisation.

She was elected founding President of the European Sociological Association in 1997. In 2008, she was appointed the first holder of the UNESCO Chair in Gender Research at Lancaster University, where she also led the associated UNESCO Gender Research Group. She served as Principal for the Lancaster node of QUING, an Integrated Project funded by the European Union under Framework 6 (2006–2011) and led its work on Intersectionality. She was also co-organiser of the international network Gender Globalisation and Work Transformation (GLOW). She was elected Fellow of the British Academy in 2022.

== Biography ==
Sylvia Walby holds a PhD in Sociology from the University of Essex. Her academic career has included appointments as Lecturer in Sociology and Director of the Women's Studies Research Centre at Lancaster University; Reader in Sociology and Director of the Gender Institute at the London School of Economics (LSE); Professor and Head of Department of Sociology at the University of Bristol; and Professor of Sociology at the University of Leeds. She later returned to Lancaster University, where she established the Violence and Society Centre. She assumed her current post as Professor at Royal Holloway, University of London, in 2023.

Sylvia Walby has held visiting positions at numerous institutions, including as Visiting Associate Professor at UCLA, Honorary Visiting Scholar at the Schlesinger Library, Harvard University, and visiting posts at the National University of Malaysia, the University of Aalborg, the University of Wisconsin-Madison, the University of Duisburg-Essen, and the University of Malta.

She was founding President of the European Sociological Association and has served as Chair of the Women's Studies Network UK. Within the International Sociological Association, she has held positions, including President of Research Committee 02 (Economy and Society) and founding Co-President of Working Group 11 (Violence and Society).

Her research focuses on the intersection between general social theory and specific forms of inequality, with particular emphasis on gender. Her academic trajectory has evolved from early work on theories of patriarchy to incorporating intersectionality and complexity theory in contemporary social theory. Her interests include economic structures, emerging political formations, and the experiences of marginalised groups, all analysed in the context of globalisation.

She was elected Fellow of the Academy of Social Sciences in 2007 and was appointed Officer of the Order of the British Empire (OBE) in 2008 for services to equal opportunities and diversity. In 2017 she was awarded an Honorary Doctorate in Social Sciences (DSSc) from Queen's University Belfast in recognition of her contribution to sociology. In 2022, she was elected a Fellow of the British Academy (FBA), the United Kingdom's national academy for the humanities and social sciences and was named Chair-Elect of the Academy's Sociology Section in 2024.

== Research and Publications ==
=== Social theory, Complexity theory ===
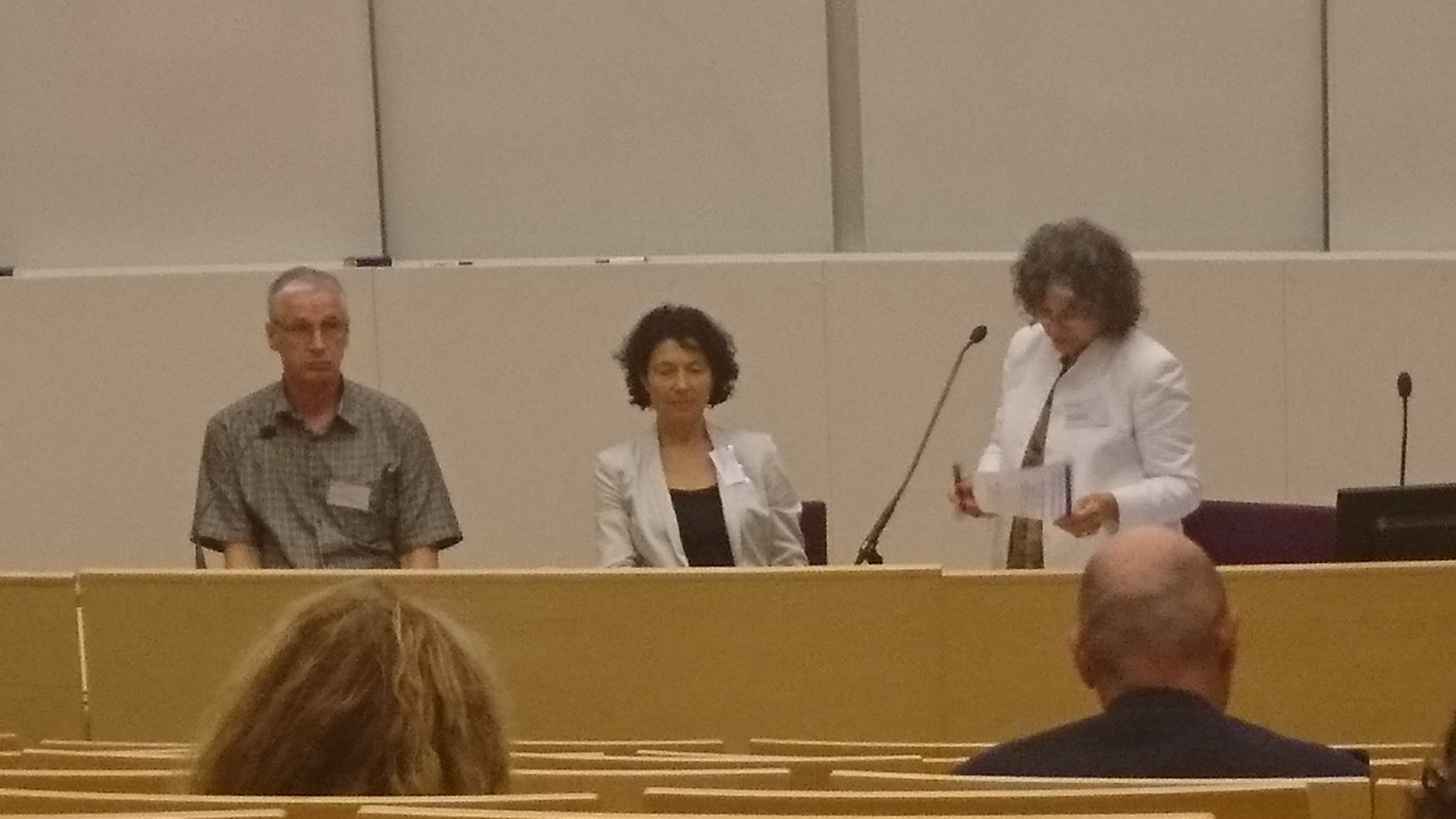
Sylvia Walby (middle) in the Power and Global Governance Session during the Power and Governance conference at the University of Tampere, Finland, August 2018

Walby’s work engages with theories of society, seeking to include gender and intersecting inequalities, and violence. She has developed the application of complex systems theory to the theory of society to include intersectionality and violence, as in Globalization and Inequalities: Complexity and Contested Modernities (2009).

=== Gender Regimes, Patriarchy ===
Walby is best known for her work on gender inequalities. Her early books, Patriarchy at Work (1986) and Theorizing Patriarchy (1990) established a way of conceptualising patriarchy that differentiated between structures of economy (paid and unpaid), polity, violence and civil society (including sexuality). In later work, from Gender Transformations (1997) onwards, including recent special issues of Social Politics (2020) and Women’s Studies International Forum (2023), the concept of gender regimes is developed, to better emphasise the importance of the varieties of forms that systems of gender relations take across time and space. There is a body of empirical work focused on employment and political economy, including early work with the Lancaster Regionalism Group, Localities, Class and Gender (1985), and Restructuring: Place, Class and Gender (1990), and later work with the international network on Gender Globalization and Work Transformation (GLOW), including Gendering the Knowledge Economy (2007).

=== Violence and Society ===
Walby has worked on violence and society for many years, including Sex Crime in the News (with Soothill 1991), Stopping Rape (with colleagues) (2015), The Concept and Measurement of Violence against Women and Men (with colleagues) (2017) and Trafficking Chains: Modern Slavery in Society (2024). This has included reports for UK and European governmental agencies on the measurement and cost of domestic violence, gender-based violence, and trafficking in human beings. The research of Walby and her colleagues, Towers and Francis, was significant in reforming the measurement of violent crime by the Office for National Statistics to reduce the under-estimation of the amount of violence against women. Walby was a Member of UN Task Force on Violence Against Women, 2006.

=== Polity and Politics ===
Walby has researched on polities and politics. She has been critical of the concept of nation-state for falsely assuming that economy, polity, violence and civil society mapped onto each other in the same territory (Globalization and Inequalities 2009), treated the development of the European Union as highly significant (see European societies: fusion or fission 1999), all in the context of globalization. Her analysis of feminist politics (The Future of Feminism 2011), which includes contributions on gender mainstreaming and intersectionality, argues for the importance of feminism in shaping the future of society.

=== Books ===
- Walby, Sylvia; Lancaster Regionalism Group (1985). Localities, class, and gender. Research in Planning and Design Series (13). London: Pion. ISBN 9780850861150.
- Walby, Sylvia (1986). Patriarchy at work: patriarchal and capitalist relations in employment. Minneapolis, Minnesota: University of Minnesota Press. ISBN 9780816615896.
- Walby, Sylvia, ed. (1988). Gender segregation at work. Milton Keynes New York: Open University Press. ISBN 9780335155620.
- Walby, Sylvia (1990). Theorizing patriarchy. Oxford, UK Cambridge, Massachusetts, USA: Wiley-Blackwell. ISBN 9780631147688.
- Walby, Sylvia; Lancaster Regionalism Group (1990). Restructuring: place, class, and gender. London Newbury Park: Sage Publications. ISBN 9780803982147.
- Walby, Sylvia; Soothill, Keith (1991). Sex crime in the news. London New York: Routledge. ISBN 9780415058018.
- Walby, Sylvia; Aaron, Jane, eds. (1991). Out of the margins: women's studies in the nineties. London New York: Falmer Press. ISBN 9781850009696.
- Walby, Sylvia; Greenwell, Jane (1994). Medicine and nursing: professions in a changing health service. with Lesley Mackay and Keith Soothill. London Thousand Oaks: Sage. ISBN 9780803987425.
- Walby, Sylvia (1997). Gender transformations. London New York: Routledge. ISBN 9780203431153.
- Walby, Sylvia; Boje, Thomas P.; van Steenbergen, Bart, eds. (2007) [1999]. European societies: fusion or fission (reprint ed.). London New York: Routledge. ISBN 9780415463287.
- Abercrombie, Nicholas; Warde, Alan (2000). Contemporary British society. Sylvia Walby et al (3rd ed.). Malden, Massachusetts: Polity Press. ISBN 9780745622972.
- Walby, Sylvia; Gottfried, Heidi; Gottschall, Karin; Osawa, Mari, eds. (2007). Gendering the knowledge economy: comparative perspectives. Basingstoke England New York: Palgrave Macmillan. ISBN 9781403994578.
- Walby, Sylvia (2009). Globalization and Inequalities: Complexity and Contested Modernities. London: Sage. https://core.ac.uk/download/6181477.pdf
- Walby, Sylvia (2011). The future of feminism. Cambridge, UK Malden, Massachusetts: Polity Press. ISBN 9780745647579.
- Walby, Sylvia (2015). Crisis. Cambridge, UK Malden, Massachusetts: Polity Press. ISBN 9780745647616.
- Walby, Sylvia, Philippa Olive, Jude Towers, Brian Francis, Sofia Strid, Andrea Krizsan, Emanuela Lombardo, Corinne May-Chahal, Suzanne Franzway, David Sugarman, Bina Agarwal and Jo Armstrong (2015). Stopping Rape: Towards a Comprehensive Policy. Bristol: Policy Press. https://doi.org/10.51952/9781447351566
- Walby, Sylvia, Jude Towers, Susie Balderston, Consuelo Corradi, Brian Francis, Markku Heiskanen, Karin Helweg-Larsen, Lut Mergaert, Philippa Olive, Emma Palmer, Heidi Stöckl and Sofia Strid (2017).The Concept and Measurement of Violence against Women and Men. Bristol: Policy Press. https://doi.org/10.51952/9781447332640
- Walby, Sylvia and Karen A. Shire (2024). Trafficking Chains: Modern Slavery in Society. Bristol: Bristol University Press. Trafficking Chains. https://doi.org/10.51952/9781529232363_001
