= Diana Paton =

British historian and academic

Diana Paton FRHistS
- Born: 1969 (age 56–57)

Academic background
- Education: University of Warwick; Yale University

Academic work
- Discipline: Historian
- Sub-discipline: History of the Caribbean; slavery in the Caribbean; gender history; Obeah
- Institutions: The Queen's College, Oxford; Newcastle University; University of Edinburgh

Diana Paton, FRHistS (born 1969) is a British historian and academic. She specialises in the history of the Caribbean, including slavery, crime and punishment, gender history, and religion. Since 2016, she has been William Robertson Professor of History at the University of Edinburgh. She previously worked at The Queen's College, Oxford and Newcastle University, where she rose to be Professor of Caribbean History before moving to Edinburgh.

== Education ==
Paton studied at Warwick University (BA) and Yale University (PhD). Her doctoral thesis was submitted in 1999, and was titled "No bond but the law: punishment and justice in Jamaica's age of emancipation, 1780-1870".

== Academic career ==
Paton began her academic career as a junior research fellow at The Queen's College, Oxford. In 2000, she joined Newcastle University as a lecturer. She was promoted to Reader in Caribbean History in 2008, and to Professor of Caribbean History in 2015. In July 2016, she moved to the University of Edinburgh where she had been appointed to the William Robertson Chair of History.

She is an elected Fellow of the Royal Historical Society (FRHistS) and an editor of History Workshop Journal.

== Selected works ==
- Paton, Diana (2001). "Punishment, Crime, and the Bodies of Slaves in Eighteenth-Century Jamaica". Journal of Social History. 34 (4): 923–954. doi:10.1353/jsh.2001.0066. ISSN 0022-4529. JSTOR 3789424. PMID 18754158. S2CID 29531689.
- Paton, Diana (2004). No bond but the law: punishment, race, and gender in Jamaican state formation, 1780-1870. Durham, NC: Duke University Press. ISBN 0822334011.
- Scully, Pamela; Paton, Diana, eds. (2005). Gender and slave emancipation in the Atlantic world. Durham, NC: Duke University Press. ISBN 0822335816.
- Paton, Diana (2012). Obeah and other powers: the politics of Caribbean religion and healing. Durham, NC: Duke University Press. ISBN 978-0822351337.
- Paton, Diana (2015). The cultural politics of Obeah: religion, colonialism and modernity in the Caribbean world. Cambridge: Cambridge University Press. ISBN 978-1107025653.
- Paton, Diana; Smith, Matthew J., eds. (2021). The Jamaica reader: history, culture, politics. Durham: Duke University Press. ISBN 978-1478010494.
