= Michael Yeabsley =

English cricketer (born 1972)

Personal information
- Full name: Michael Ian Yeabsley
- Born: 8 August 1972 (age 54); St Albans, Hertfordshire, England
- Batting: Right-handed
- Bowling: Right-arm off break
- Relatives: Doug Yeabsley (father); Richard Yeabsley (brother)

Domestic team information
- Years: Team
- 1995: Cambridge University
- FC debut: 27 April 1995 Cambridge Univ. v Nottinghamshire
- Last FC: 9 June 1995 Cambridge Univ. v Middlesex

Career statistics
Competition	First-class
Matches	2
Runs scored	2
Batting average	0.50
100s/50s	0/0
Top score	2
Balls bowled	108
Wickets	2
Bowling average	42.00
5 wickets in innings	0
10 wickets in match	0
Best bowling	1/28
Catches/stumpings	0/–
- Source: CricketArchive, 10 December 2008

Michael Ian Yeabsley (born 1972) is an English former first-class cricketer.

Son of former Devon player, Doug Yeabsley, and brother of fellow first-class player Richard, Yeabsley was educated at Haberdashers' Aske's Boys' School and then Durham University (1991–1994), where he studied Geography and represented Durham University RFC. He undertook his PGCE at Cambridge University as a member of Queens' College, and trained under Rex Walford.

During his brief cricket career, he was an off-break bowler. At Cambridge, he represented the university cricket club, playing just two first-class matches (both in 1995), taking two wickets at a cost of 42 runs each. After university, he became a teacher, and was appointed Head of Geography and, initially, Master in Charge of Cricket at Aldenham School in 2008.
