= Mobilities =

Paradigm in the social sciences

Mobilities is a contemporary paradigm in the social sciences that explores the movement of people (human migration, individual mobility, travel, transport), ideas (see e.g. meme) and things (transport), as well as the broader social implications of those movements. Mobility can also be thought as the movement of people through social classes, social mobility or income, income mobility.

A mobility "turn" (or transformation) in the social sciences began in the 1990s in response to the increasing realization of the historic and contemporary importance of movement on individuals and society. This turn has been driven by generally increased levels of mobility and new forms of mobility where bodies combine with information and different patterns of mobility. The mobilities paradigm incorporates new ways of theorizing about how these mobilities lie "at the center of constellations of power, the creation of identities and the microgeographies of everyday life." (Cresswell, 2011, 551)

The mobility turn arose as a response to the way in which the social sciences had traditionally been static, seeing movement as a black box and ignoring or trivializing "the importance of the systematic movements of people for work and family life, for leisure and pleasure, and for politics and protest" (Sheller and Urry, 2006, 208). Mobilities emerged as a critique of contradictory orientations toward both sedentarism and deterritorialisation in social science. People had often been seen as static entities tied to specific places, or as nomadic and placeless in a frenetic and globalized existence. Mobilities looks at movements and the forces that drive, constrain and are produced by those movements.

Several typologies have been formulated to clarify the wide variety of mobilities. Most notably, John Urry divides mobilities into five types: mobility of objects, corporeal mobility, imaginative mobility, virtual mobility and communicative mobility. Later, Leopoldina Fortunati and Sakari Taipale proposed an alternative typology taking the individual and the human body as a point of reference. They differentiate between ‘macro-mobilities’ (consistent physical displacements), ‘micro-mobilities’ (small-scale displacements), ‘media mobility’ (mobility added to the traditionally fixed forms of media) and ‘disembodied mobility’ (the transformation in the social order). The categories are typically considered interrelated, and therefore they are not exclusive.

== Scope ==
While mobilities is commonly associated with sociology, contributions to the mobilities literature have come from scholars in anthropology, cultural studies, economics, geography, migration studies, science and technology studies, and tourism and transport studies. (Sheller and Urry, 2006, 207)

The eponymous journal Mobilities provides a list of typical subjects which have been explored in the mobilities paradigm (Taylor and Francis, 2011):

- Mobile spatiality and temporality
- Sustainable and alternative mobilities
- Mobile rights and risks
- New social networks and mobile media
- Immobilities and social exclusions
- Tourism and travel mobilities
- Migration and diasporas
- Transportation and communication technologies
- Transitions in complex systems

== Origins ==
Sheller and Urry (2006, 215) place mobilities in the sociological tradition by defining the primordial theorist of mobilities as Georg Simmel (1858–1918). Simmel's essays, "Bridge and Door" (Simmel, 1909 / 1994) and "The Metropolis and Mental Life" (Simmel, 1903 / 2001) identify a uniquely human will to connection, as well as the urban demands of tempo and precision that are satisfied with mobility.

The more immediate precursors of contemporary mobilities research emerged in the 1990s (Cresswell 2011, 551). Historian James Clifford (1997) advocated for a shift from deep analysis of particular places to the routes connecting them. Marc Augé (1995) considered the philosophical potential of an anthropology of "non-places" like airports and motorways that are characterized by constant transition and temporality. Sociologist Manuel Castells outlined a "network society" and suggested that the "space of places" is being surpassed by a "space of flows." Feminist scholar Caren Kaplan (1996) explored questions about the gendering of metaphors of travel in social and cultural theory.

The contemporary paradigm under the moniker "mobilities" appears to originate with the work of sociologist John Urry. In his book, Sociology Beyond Societies: Mobilities for the Twenty-First Century, Urry (2000, 1) presents a "manifesto for a sociology that examines the diverse mobilities of peoples, objects, images, information and wastes; and of the complex interdependencies between, and social consequences of, these diverse mobilities."

This is consistent with the aims and scope of the eponymous journal Mobilities, which "examines both the large-scale movements of people, objects, capital, and information across the world, as well as more local processes of daily transportation, movement through public and private spaces, and the travel of material things in everyday life" (Taylor and Francis, 2011).

In 2006, Mimi Sheller and John Urry published an oft-cited paper that examined the mobilities paradigm as it was just emerging, exploring its motivations, theoretical underpinnings, and methodologies. Sheller and Urry specifically focused on automobility as a powerful socio-technical system that "impacts not only on local public spaces and opportunities for coming together, but also on the formation of gendered subjectivities, familial and social networks, spatially segregated urban neighborhoods, national images and aspirations to modernity, and global relations ranging from transnational migration to terrorism and oil wars" (Sheller and Urry, 2006, 209). This was further developed by the journal Mobilities (Hannam, Sheller and Urry, 2006).

Mobilities can be viewed as an extension of the "spatial turn" in the arts and sciences in the 1980s, in which scholars began "to interpret space and the spatiality of human life with the same critical insight and interpretive power as have traditionally been given to time and history (the historicality of human life) on one hand, and to social relations and society (the sociality of human life) on the other" (Sheller and Urry, 2006, 216; Engel and Nugent, 2010, 1; Soja, 1999 / 2005, 261).

Engel and Nugent (2010) trace the conceptual roots of the spatial turn to Ernst Cassirer and Henri Lefebvre (1974), although Fredric Jameson appears to have coined the epochal usage of the term for the 1980s paradigm shift. Jameson (1988 / 2003, 154) notes that the concept of the spatial turn "has often seemed to offer one of the more productive ways of distinguishing postmodernism from modernism proper, whose experience of temporality -- existential time, along with deep memory -- it is henceforth conventional to see as dominant of the high modern."

For Oswin & Yeoh (2010) mobility seems to be inextricably intertwined with late-modernity and the end of the nation-state. The sense of mobility makes us to think in migratory and tourist fluxes as well as the necessary infrastructure for that displacement takes place.

P. Vannini (2012) opted to see mobility as a projection of existent cultural values, expectancies and structures that denotes styles of life. Mobility after all would not only generate effects on people's behaviour but also specific styles of life. Vannini explains convincingly that on Canada's coast, the values of islanders defy the hierarchal order in populated cities from many perspectives. Islanders prioritize the social cohesion and trust of their communities before the alienation of mega-cities. There is a clear physical isolation that marks the boundaries between urbanity and rurality. From another view, nonetheless, this ideological dichotomy between authenticity and alienation leads residents to commercialize their spaces to outsiders. Although the tourism industry is adopted in these communities as a form of activity, many locals have historically migrated from urban populated cities.

== Mobilities and transportation geography ==
The intellectual roots of mobilities in sociology distinguish it from traditional transportation studies and transportation geography, which have firmer roots in mid 20th century positivist spatial science.

Cresswell (2011, 551) presents six characteristics distinguishing mobilities from prior approaches to the study of migration or transport:

- Mobilities often links science and social science to the humanities.
- Mobilities often links across different scales of movement, while traditional transportation geography tends to focus on particular forms of movement at only one scale (such as local traffic studies or household travel surveys).
- Mobilities encompasses the movement of people, objects, and ideas, rather than narrowly focusing on areas like passenger modal shift or freight logistics.
- Mobilities considers both motion and "stopping, stillness and relative immobility."
- Mobilities incorporates mobile theorization and methodologies to avoid the privileging of "notions of boundedness and the sedentary."
- Mobilities often embraces the political and differential politics of mobility, as opposed to the apolitical, "objective" stance often sought by researchers associated with engineering disciplines

Mobilities can be seen as a postmodern descendant of modernist transportation studies, with the influence of the spatial turn corresponding to a "post-structuralist agnosticism about both naturalistic and universal explanations and about single-voiced historical narratives, and to the concomitant recognition that position and context are centrally and inescapably implicated in all constructions of knowledge" (Cosgrove, 1999, 7; Warf and Arias, 2009).

Despite these ontological and epistemological differences, Shaw and Hesse (2010, 207) have argued that mobilities and transport geography represent points on a continuum rather than incompatible extremes. Indeed, traditional transport geography has not been wholly quantitative any more than mobilities is wholly qualitative. Sociological explorations of mobility can incorporate empirical techniques, while model-based inquiries can be tempered with richer understandings of the meanings, representations and assumptions inherently embedded in models.

Shaw and Sidaway (2010, 505) argue that even as research in the mobilities paradigm has attempted to reengage transportation and the social sciences, mobilities shares a fate similar to traditional transportation geography in still remaining outside the mainstream of the broader academic geographic community.

== Theoretical underpinnings of mobilities ==
Sheller and Urry (2006, 215-217) presented six bodies of theory underpinning the mobilities paradigm:

The prime theoretical foundation of mobilities is the work of early 20th-century sociologist Georg Simmel, who identified a uniquely human "will to connection," and provided a theoretical connection between mobility and materiality. Simmel focused on the increased tempo of urban life, that "drives not only its social, economic, and infrastructural formations, but also the psychic forms of the urban dweller." Along with this tempo comes a need for precision in timing and location in order to prevent chaos, which results in complex and novel systems of relationships.

A second body of theory comes from the science and technology studies which look at mobile sociotechnical systems that incorporate hybrid geographies of human and nonhuman components. Automobile, rail or air transport systems involve complex transport networks that affect society and are affected by society. These networks can have dynamic and enduring parts. Non-transport information networks can also have unpredictable effects on encouraging or suppressing physical mobility (Pellegrino 2012).

A third body of theory comes from the postmodern conception of spatiality, with the substance of places being constantly in motion and subject to constant reassembly and reconfiguration (Thrift 1996).

A fourth body of theory is a "recentring of the corporeal body as an affective vehicle through which we sense place and movement, and construct emotional geographies". For example, the car is "experienced through a combination of senses and sensed through multiple registers of motion and emotion″ (Sheller and Urry 2006, 216).

A fifth body of theory incorporates how topologies of social networks relate to how complex patterns form and change. Contemporary information technologies and ways of life often create broad but weak social ties across time and space, with social life incorporating fewer chance meetings and more networked connections.

Finally, the last body of theory is the analysis of complex transportation systems that are "neither perfectly ordered nor anarchic." For example, the rigid spatial coupling, operational timings, and historical bindings of rail contrast with unpredictable environmental conditions and ever-shifting political winds. And, yet, "change through the accumulation of small repetitions...could conceivably tip the car system into the postcar system."

== Mobilities methodologies ==
Mimi Sheller and John Urry (2006, 217-219) presented seven methodological areas often covered in mobilities research:

- Analysis of the patterning, timing and causation of face-to-face co-presence
- Mobile ethnography - participation in patterns of movement while conducting ethnographic research
- Time-space diaries - subjects record what they are doing, at what times and in what places
- Cyber-research - exploration of virtual mobilities through various forms of electronic connectivity
- Study of experiences and feelings
- Study of memory and private worlds via photographs, letters, images and souvenirs
- Study of in-between places and transfer points like lounges, waiting rooms, cafes, amusement arcades, parks, hotels, airports, stations, motels, harbors

== See also ==
- Bicycle
- Congestion
- Home care
- Hypermobility (travel)
- Pedestrian
- Public transport
- Private transport
- Transportation engineering
