= William Roseberry =

American anthropologist (1950–2000)

- Born: 1950; Little Rock, Arkansas, U.S.
- Died: August 2000 (aged 49–50)

Academic background
- Education: Southern Methodist University; University of Connecticut
- Thesis: Social Class and Social Process in the Venezuelan Andes (1977)
- Doctoral advisor: Scott Cook

Academic work
- Discipline: Anthropology
- Sub-discipline: Historical anthropology, political economy, peasant studies
- Institutions: University of Iowa; The New School; New York University
- Main interests: Culture, history, and political economy in Latin America
- Notable works: Coffee and Capitalism in the Venezuelan Andes (1983); Anthropologies and Histories (1989)
- Notable ideas: Hegemony as a common framework of contention

William "Bill" Roseberry (1950 – August 2000) was an American anthropologist known for his historical materialist approach to the study of Latin America, his writing on the history of peasantries, and his work at the intersection of history and anthropology. He taught for many years at the New School for Social Research, where he was professor of anthropology and chaired the Janey Program in Latin American Studies, and from 1999 at New York University.

== Early life and education ==
Roseberry was born in 1950 and raised in Little Rock, Arkansas.

He received his undergraduate education at Southern Methodist University in Dallas, and later studied under Scott Cook at the University of Connecticut, where he was awarded a Ph.D. in anthropology in 1977. His dissertation, "Social Class and Social Process in the Venezuelan Andes", drew on two years of fieldwork in Venezuela.

== Career ==
After a brief period at the University of Iowa, Roseberry joined the faculty of the New School for Social Research in New York, where he trained both historians and anthropologists in the study of Latin America. In 1999 he was appointed senior Latin American historian at New York University, a move that formalized his long association with historically grounded research and training.

Roseberry described his own interests as lying in culture, history, and political economy in Latin America, and in the formation of subjects at the conjunction of varied historical processes—work ranging from the nineteenth-century Venezuelan Andes, to the comparative history of coffee-producing regions in Latin America, to the comparative history of domestic economies in early modern England and colonial Mexico. His fieldwork in Michoacán on the last of these subjects had only begun to bear fruit at the time of his death; work drawn from it on nineteenth-century Pátzcuaro appeared posthumously.

== Work ==
Roseberry's scholarship combined anthropology and history with what Lowell Gudmundson called a culturally sophisticated historical materialism, in a tradition associated with Eric Wolf, whose work Roseberry discussed in several review essays and comments.

=== Critique of interpretive anthropology ===
In Anthropologies and Histories (1989) and related essays he criticized interpretive and postmodern currents in anthropology—including the work of Clifford Geertz, Marshall Sahlins, and Michael Taussig—for treating capitalism, colonialism, and the state as an unexamined background to be "invoked" rather than analyzed. The book opens with a critical reading of Geertz's essay on the Balinese cockfight, arguing that Geertz and his followers give insufficient attention to cultural differentiation and to the social and political inequalities that shape how differently placed actors understand the world. Writing after Roseberry's death, the historian Hermann Rebel—a frequent collaborator—characterized this critique as directed at anthropologies capable of rendering violence innocuous within culturally naturalized articulations of power, and singled out Roseberry's insistence that ethnographic writing which makes acts of domination appear harmless is for that reason not realistic.

=== Hegemony ===
Roseberry's treatment of hegemony, developed from Gramsci and Raymond Williams, is among the most widely cited parts of his work. He proposed that hegemony be understood not as a shared ideology or as finished domination but as a heuristic concept directing attention to the continuous production of a common discursive framework within which inequality is contested—so that analysis should focus on points of rupture, the areas where such a common framework cannot be achieved. These arguments were set out chiefly in Anthropologies and Histories, in his 1988 Annual Review of Anthropology essay on political economy, and in "Hegemony and the Language of Contention" (1994).

=== Multiculturalism and Anthropology ===
In "Multiculturalism and the Challenge of Anthropology" (1992), Roseberry argued that an adequate challenge to Western ethnocentrism required three dimensions of intercultural understanding—attention to other modes of being, to systematic connections between Western and non-Western societies, and to the rethinking of categories—and contended that multiculturalist writing had largely neglected the second.

In "The Unbearable Lightness of Anthropology" (1996), he examined two crises in the discipline—the crisis of representation of the 1980s and the crisis of academic employment of the 1990s—arguing that they should be understood together. Using the anthropological notion of the conical clan to describe hierarchy among American departments, he suggested that the combination of a contracting job market with the institutional success of "post" approaches risked narrowing the range of politically engaged anthropology, leaving what he called "anthropology-lite".

== Death and legacy ==
Roseberry died in August 2000, at age 50, after a brief illness with cancer; a memorial service was held by the Department of History at New York University on 7 October 2000. His death came a few months after that of Eric Wolf.

The Society for Latin American and Caribbean Anthropology awards an annual Roseberry–Nash Graduate Student Paper Prize, which honors the contributions of Roseberry and June Nash to the anthropological study of Latin America.

Rebel presented an extended essay in Roseberry's memory to the Canadian Anthropology Society in 2003, published in Spanish in Relaciones in 2004 and in English in Critique of Anthropology in 2007. The same 2007 issue of Critique of Anthropology carried further assessments of his work, including Andrew Roth-Seneff on his critical method and Winnie Lem on the application of his concept of class to the anthropology of migration.

== Selected publications ==
=== Books ===
- Coffee and Capitalism in the Venezuelan Andes. Austin: University of Texas Press, 1983.
- Anthropologies and Histories: Essays in Culture, History, and Political Economy. New Brunswick: Rutgers University Press, 1989.
- Golden Ages, Dark Ages: Imagining the Past in Anthropology and History, coedited with Jay O'Brien. Berkeley: University of California Press, 1991.
- Confronting Historical Paradigms: Peasants, Labor, and the Capitalist World System in Africa and Latin America, with Frederick Cooper, Allen Isaacman, Florencia Mallon, and Steve Stern. Madison: University of Wisconsin Press, 1993.
- Coffee, Society, and Power in Latin America, coedited with Lowell Gudmundson and Mario Samper Kutschbach. Baltimore: Johns Hopkins University Press, 1995.

=== Selected articles and chapters ===
- "Rent, Differentiation, and the Development of Capitalism among Peasants". American Anthropologist 78 (1976): 45–58.
- "Political Economy". Annual Review of Anthropology 17 (1988): 161–185.
- "Tristes Tropes: Post-Modern Anthropologists Encounter the Other and Discover Themselves", with Nicole Polier. Economy and Society 18 (1989): 245–264.
- "Multiculturalism and the Challenge of Anthropology". Social Research 59, no. 4 (1992): 841–858.
- "Hegemony and the Language of Contention". In Everyday Forms of State Formation: Revolution and the Negotiation of Rule in Modern Mexico, edited by Gilbert M. Joseph and Daniel Nugent. Durham: Duke University Press, 1994.
- "Latin American Peasant Studies in a 'Postcolonial' Era". Journal of Latin American Anthropology 1 (1995): 15–77.
- "The Rise of Yuppie Coffees and the Reimagination of Class in the United States". American Anthropologist 98 (1996): 762–775.
- "The Unbearable Lightness of Anthropology". Radical History Review 65 (1996): 5–25.
- "Marx and Anthropology". Annual Review of Anthropology 26 (1997): 25–46.
