= Doug Yeabsley =

English cricketer (born 1942)

Personal information
- Full name: Douglas Ian Yeabsley
- Born: 3 January 1942 (age 84); Exeter, Devon, England
- Batting: Left-handed
- Bowling: Left-arm medium-fast
- Role: Bowler
- Relatives: Richard Yeabsley (son); Michael Yeabsley (son)

Domestic team information
- Years: Team
- 1959–1991: Devon
- 1974–1981: Minor Counties (West/South)
- FC debut: 20 July 1974 Minor Counties v Pakistanis
- Last FC: 4 August 1981 Minor Counties v Sri Lankans
- List A debut: 10 May 1969 Devon v Hertfordshire
- Last List A: 24 June 1987 Devon v Worcestershire

Career statistics
| Competition | First-class | List A |
|---|---|---|
| Matches | 4 | 41 |
| Runs scored | 27 | 164 |
| Batting average | 9.00 | 13.66 |
| 100s/50s | 0/0 | 0/0 |
| Top score | 14* | 22* |
| Balls bowled | 837 | 2,358 |
| Wickets | 13 | 36 |
| Bowling average | 29.92 | 32.27 |
| 5 wickets in innings | 0 | 0 |
| 10 wickets in match | 0 | 0 |
| Best bowling | 3/45 | 3/21 |
| Catches/stumpings | 1/– | 5/– |
- Source: CricketArchive, 10 December 2008

Douglas Ian Yeabsley (born 3 January 1942), is a former cricketer who represented the Minor Counties and, particularly, Devon County Cricket Club from 1959 to 1990, a span of 31 years. Yeabsley played a role in a victory for Minor Counties over the visiting Australian cricket team in 1977.

He also played top class rugby union: "as a back-row forward for Harlequins for many years", and, as a flanker, for Saracens and Hertfordshire. Away from sport, he taught chemistry at Haberdashers' Aske's School.

== Cricket career ==
A left-arm medium pace bowler and a left-handed tail end batsman, Yeabsley made his debut for Devon "in 1959, aged 17, while still at Exeter School, and continued for 31 seasons, a tribute to his durability and skill".

Yeabsley made four appearances in first-class cricket and 41 in List A matches. His first-class appearances were all made for the Minor Counties representative team against touring international opposition. His best bowling return was achieved against the 1974 Pakistan touring team, taking 3–45 including the wickets of Mushtaq Mohammad, Wasim Bari and Wasim Raja—all Test players.

Yeabsley's last List A appearance was against Worcestershire in the 1987 NatWest Trophy, when he was 45. Ian Botham and Graeme Hick both made hundreds. Worcestershire scored their 404 runs at a rate of nearly seven runs per over. Yeabsley's 12 overs cost just 50 runs; the other four bowlers conceded between 79 and 97 runs off the same number of overs.

Yeabsley has been described as "undoubtedly England's best amateur bowler of the seventies, bowling left-arm fast medium."

== Family and teaching career ==
Yeabsley's two sons, Michael and Richard, both played first-class cricket, the latter in particular with some success. Both were educated at Haberdashers' Aske's Boys School, where Doug taught chemistry from 1964 and coached the school first XI and rugby first XV.
