= Richard Yeabsley =

English cricketer (born 1973)

Personal information
- Full name: Richard Stuart Yeabsley
- Born: 2 November 1973 (age 53); St Albans, Hertfordshire, England
- Batting: Right-handed
- Bowling: Right-arm medium-fast
- Relatives: Doug Yeabsley (father); Michael Yeabsley (brother)

Domestic team information
- Years: Team
- 1990: Devon
- 1993–1995: Oxford University
- 1994–1995: Middlesex
- FC debut: 14 April 1993 Oxford Univ. v Durham
- Last FC: 5 July 1995 Oxford Univ. v Cambridge Univ.
- LA debut: 27 June 1990 Devon v Somerset
- Last LA: 13 August 1995 Middlesex v Durham

Career statistics
Competition	First-class	List A
Matches	19	5
Runs scored	204	2
Batting average	13.60	2.00
100s/50s	0/1	0/0
Top score	52*	2
Balls bowled	2,982	192
Wickets	49	6
Bowling average	32.77	27.66
5 wickets in innings	1	1
10 wickets in match	1	0
Best bowling	6/54	5/32
Catches/stumpings	11/–	1/–
- Source: CricketArchive, 10 December 2008

Richard Yeabsley (born 2 November 1973) is an English former first-class cricketer.

Son of former Devon player Doug Yeabsley, and brother of fellow first-class player Michael, Richard was educated at Haberdashers' Aske's Boys' School and Keble College, Oxford. He was a sharp medium-pace bowler and useful batsman. During his brief career, he represented Oxford University and Middlesex, playing a total of 19 first-class matches and making five List A appearances. Yeabsley quit the game, aged just 22, with a career first-class bowling average of 32.77.

His best bowling performance came in the 1994 Varsity match. He took 6–54 in the first innings, and 4–50 in the second, giving him his only five wicket innings and ten wicket match hauls.

Like his father Doug, Richard Yeabsley played top-class cricket and rugby union. In the latter, he appeared three times for London Irish.

In 2011 Yeabsley was head of foreign exchange (FX) options at BGC Partners branch in London.

== External sources ==
- Richard Yeabsley at Cricinfo
