= Non-place =

Concept in anthropology

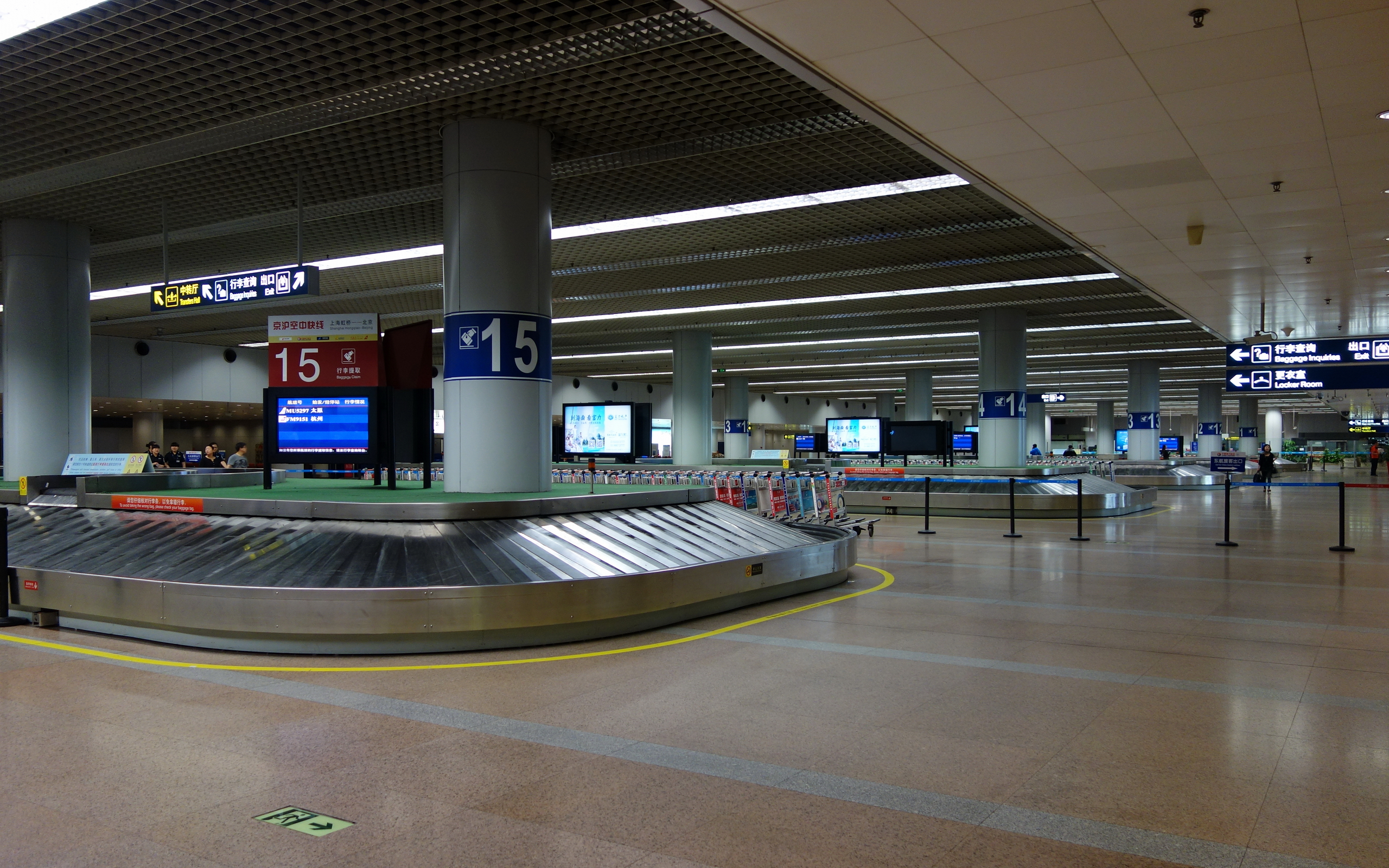
Baggage reclaim at Beijing Capital International Airport

A non-place or nonplace is an anthropological space of transience which does not hold enough significance to be regarded as a "place" in its anthropological definition, and where humans are anonymous. Examples of non-places would be motorways, hotel rooms, airports and shopping malls.

The term was coined by the French anthropologist Marc Augé in his 1992 work Non-places: introduction to an anthropology of supermodernity. Augé's term is similar to earlier concepts developed by Edward Relph in Place and Placelessness and Melvin Webber in his writing on the 'nonplace urban realm'. What distinguishes the non-place is the specific emphasis on them as spaces of transience, as opposed to solely being about a lack of local specificity.

The concept of non-place is opposed, according to Augé, to the notion of "anthropological place". The place offers people a space that empowers their identity, where they can meet other people with whom they share social references. The non-places, on the contrary, are not meeting spaces and do not build common references to a group. Finally, a non-place is a place we do not live in, in which the individual remains anonymous and lonely. Augé avoids making value judgments on non-places and looks at them from the perspective of an ethnologist who has a new field of studies to explore.

== From places to non-places ==
A significant debate concerning the term and its interpretation is described in Marc Augé's writings under the title of "From Places to Non-Places". The distinction between places and non-places derives from the opposition between space and place. An essential preliminary here is the analysis of the notions of place and space suggested by Michel de Certeau. Space for him is a frequented space and intersection of moving bodies: it is the pedestrians, who transform the street (geometrically defined by town planners) into a space.

== Mark Fisher's notion of non-time ==
For Mark Fisher, whereas cyberspace-time tends towards the generation of cultural moments that are interchangeable, hauntology involves the staining of particular places with time: a time that is out of joint. A "flattening sense of time" appears to Fisher as a byproduct of Augé's non-places, which by being absent of local flavour are indeterminate temporally as well as locally. He describes music created decades in the past as deprived of any sense of disjuncture with the present, a clear connection with his theory of capitalist realism.

== See also ==
- Cybernetics § Etymology
- Liminality
- Liminal spaces
- Sense of place
- Urban vitality
