= Marc Augé =

French anthropologist (1935–2023)

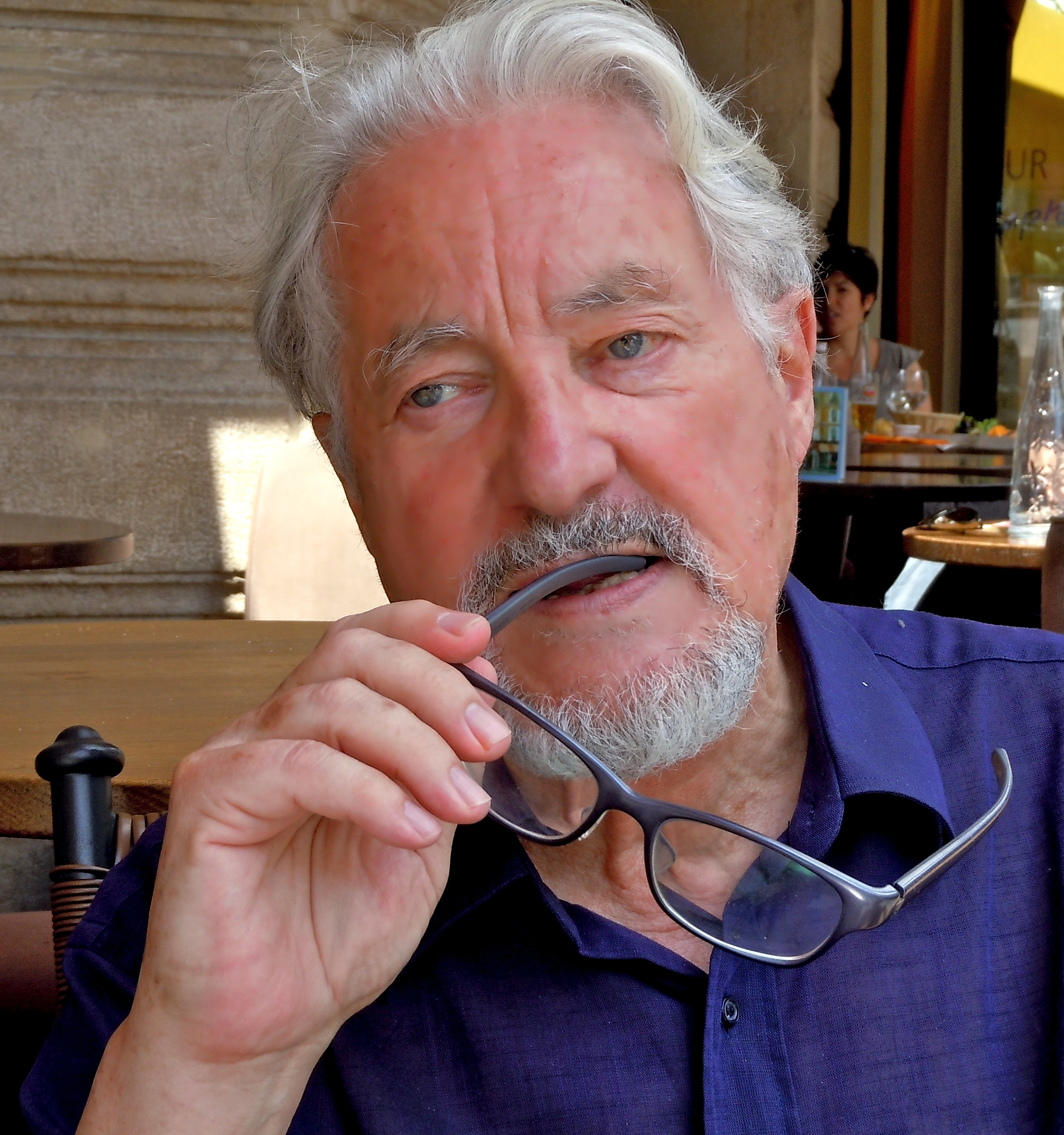
- Augé in 2010

Director of the School for Advanced Studies in the Social Sciences
- In office 1985–1995
- Preceded by: François Furet
- Succeeded by: Jacques Revel

Personal details
- Born: 2 September 1935 Poitiers, France
- Died: 24 July 2023 (aged 87) Paris, France
- Education: Lycée Montaigne; Lycée Louis-le-Grand
- Alma mater: École normale supérieure

Marc Augé (French: [oʒe]; 2 September 1935 – 24 July 2023) was a French anthropologist.

In an essay and book of the same title, Non-Places: Introduction to an Anthropology of Supermodernity (1995), Augé coined the phrase non-place to refer to spaces where concerns of relations, history, and identity are erased. Examples of a non-place would be a motorway, a hotel room, an airport or a supermarket.

== Career ==
Augé's career can be divided into three stages, reflecting shifts in both his geographical focus and theoretical development: early (African), middle (European), and late (Global). These successive stages do not involve a broadening of interest or focus as such, but rather the development of a theoretical apparatus able to meet the demands of the growing conviction that the local can no longer be understood except as a part of the complicated global whole.

=== First stage ===
Augé's career began with a series of extended field trips to West Africa, where he researched the Alladian peoples situated on the edge of a large lagoon, west of Abidjan on the Ivory Coast. The culmination of this endeavour is Le Rivage alladian: Organisation et évolution des villages alladian (1969) [The Alladian Riparian Peoples: Organisation and Evolution of Alladian Villages]. The sequel, Théorie des pouvoirs et Idéologie: Études de cas en Côte d’Ivoire (1975) [Theory of Powers and Ideology: Case Study of the Ivory Coast], followed a series of three further field excursions to the Ivory Coast between 1968 and 1971. Augé coined the term ideo-logic to describe his research object, which he defined as the inner logic of the representations a society makes of itself to itself. A third and final instalment in this series of studies of the Alladian peoples was added in 1977, Pouvoirs de vie, Pouvoirs de mort [Powers of Life, Powers of Death].

=== Second stage ===
The second or European stage, consists of a sequence of three interrelated books: La Traversée du Luxembourg (1985) [Traversing Luxembourg Gardens]; Un ethnologue dans le métro (1986); trs. as In the Metro (2002); and Domaines et Châteaux (1989) [Homes and Palaces]. In this period of his career, Augé took the novel approach of applying methods developed in the course of fieldwork in Africa to his local Parisian context. Augé focused on four key aspects of contemporary Parisian society: (i) the paradoxical increase in the intensity of solitude brought about by the expansion of communications technologies; (ii) the strange recognition that the other is also an 'I'; (iii) the non-place, the ambivalent space that has none of the familiar attributes of place—for instance, it incites no sense of belonging; (iv) the oblivion and aberration of memory. The work in this period emphasises the anthropologist's own experience in a way that neither the earlier nor later work does. Augé did this by comparing his own impressions of these places with those produced by some of French literature's greatest writers. What this comparison illustrates is the apparent insuperability of the gap between language and experience. Yet it is that very gap, he argued, that his anthropology must be able to close if it is to be of continuing relevance in contemporary society.

=== Third stage ===
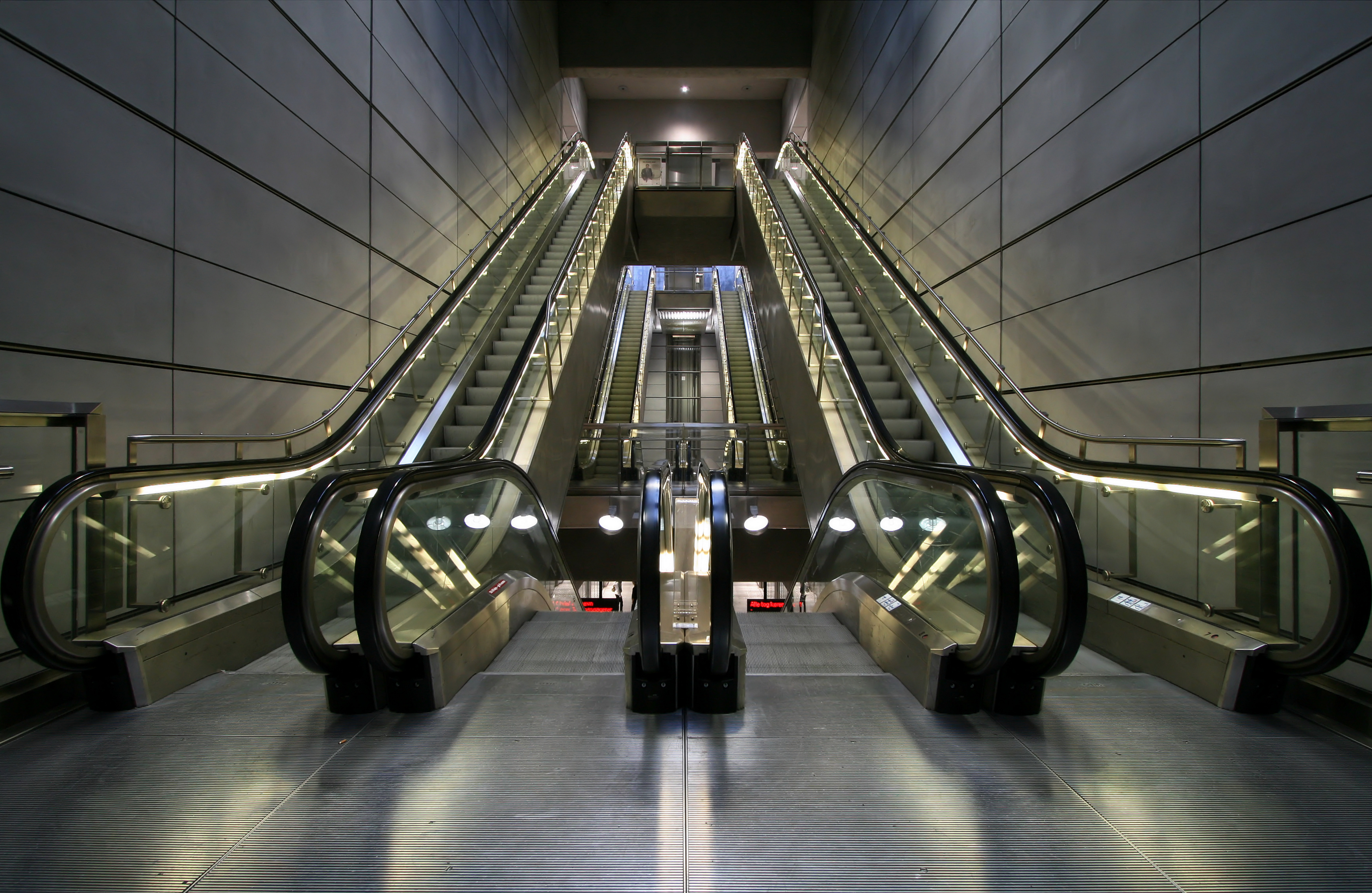
Copenhagen Metro escalators—example of a non-place

The third or global stage yielded four books: Non-Lieux, Introduction à une anthropologie de la surmodernité (1992); trs. as Non-Places: Introduction to an Anthropology of Supermodernity (1995); Le Sens des autres: Actualité de l'anthropologie (1994); trs. as A Sense for the Other: The Timeliness and Relevance of Anthropology (1998); Pour une anthropologie des mondes contemporains (1994); trs. as An Anthropology for Contemporaneous Worlds (1998); and La Guerre des rêves: exercises d'ethno-fiction (1997); trs. as The War of Dreams: Exercises in Ethno-Fiction (1999). Taken together these works comprise an extended meditation on the disparity between observations made in the course of anthropological fieldwork in the first and the second stages of his career. It is at least partially the result of Augé's travels—for instance, his concept of the non-place refers to those spaces one typically encounters when travelling such as airports, bus terminals, hotels and so on, which one often only remembers in very generic terms. Ultimately, his aim is to theorise globalisation as it is lived in properly global terms; it is also an attempt to reinvigorate the discipline of anthropology as a whole. To that end he deploys a number of novel writing techniques, describing the synthetic results as "ethno-novels".

== Reception ==
Much of Augé's writing considers globalization, and his work on global modernism has contributed to investigations of the concept of mobility. He explored the philosophical potential of an anthropology of "non-places" like airports and motorways that are characterized by constant transition and temporality. Both Peter Merriman and Bruno Latour criticized Augé's book Un Ethnologue dans le Métro for failing to examine the hidden complexities of the Paris métro, such as its drivers and engineers, the role of the State, and management of passenger movements and transactions. Latour said Augé had "limited himself to studying the most superficial aspects of the métro".

Regarding globalization and its influence on art, as critics and art theorists have pointed out, Augé's thought is frequently cited in essays, articles, and books in this century, whose authors allude to the concept of non-places as a vivid and evident influence on the work of contemporary visual artists.

== Personal life ==
Augé was born in Poitiers on 2 September 1935. He died on 24 July 2023, at the age of 87.

== Selected works ==
- Non-Places: Introduction to an Anthropology of Supermodernity, 1995.
- In the Metro. Minneapolis: University of Minnesota Press, 2002.
- Oblivion. Minneapolis: University of Minnesota Press, 2004.
- The Future. London and New York: Verso, 2015.
- Everyone Dies Young: Time Without Age. New York: Columbia University Press, 2016.

== See also ==
- Supermodernity
