= Haberdashers' Boys' School =

Independent day school in Hertfordshire, England

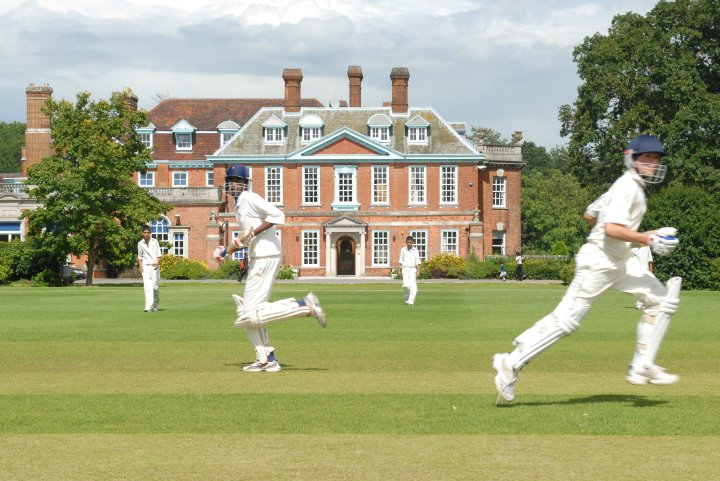
- Coat of arms of the Haberdashers' Company Boys playing cricket in front of Aldenham House

Location
- Butterfly Lane; Elstree, Hertfordshire, WD6 3AF; United Kingdom; 51.6564°N 0.3124°W

Information
- Type: 4–18 boys Public and Independent day school
- Religious affiliation: Church of England
- Established: 1690; 336 years ago
- Department for Education URN: 117648 Tables
- Chairman: Simon Cartmell
- Executive Principal: Gus Lock
- Headmaster: Robert Sykes
- Gender: Boys
- Age: 4 to 18
- Enrolment: 1,095 pupils
- Houses: Calverts (Orange); Hendersons (Red); Joblings (Green); Meadows (Purple); Russells (Light Blue); Strouts (Yellow)
- Colours: Navy and sky blue
- Publication: Skylark, Skylight, SCOPE, Scribe, Timeline, Habs Geographical, Veritas, The Score, ENIGMA
- Alumni: Old Haberdashers
- Website: www.habselstree.org.uk/boys

Haberdashers' Boys' School (formerly Haberdashers' Aske's Boys' School) is a private school for boys aged 4–18 in Elstree, Hertfordshire, England. It is a member of the Headmastersʼ and Headmistressesʼ Conference.

The school was founded in 1690 by a Royal Charter granted to the Worshipful Company of Haberdashers to establish a hospital for 20 boarders with £32,000 from the legacy of Robert Aske (equivalent to approximately £5m in 2019).

The school relocated from its original site in Hoxton in 1874, eventually (1961) moving to 104 acres of green belt countryside in Elstree.

It sits on the same site as the Haberdashers' Girls' School.

== History ==
=== 1690–1738 ===
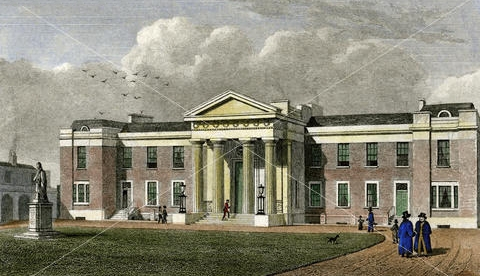
Aske's Hospital, the school's first home

Following a bequest of approximately £20,000 made by the merchant Robert Aske to the Worshipful Company of Haberdashers on his death in 1689, an almshouse for twenty needy members of the Haberdashersʼ Company was established in 1690 just outside the City of London at Hoxton. Designed by Robert Hooke, the almshouse comprised a chapel and, at its centre, the school, which provided education for 20 sons of poor freemen between the ages of nine and fifteen. However, the chaplain, Thomas Wright, was then made master of Bunhill School and was thus unable to teach the boys at Askeʼs. In 1697, therefore, John Pridie was appointed to teach the boys English, the catechism, and basic grammar at a salary of £40 a month. Soon afterward, Pridie secured the right to admit pupils from paying parents, allowing him to increase the amount of money spent on the boys' education. However, this right did not last for long.

In 1701, the school instituted new rules that introduced a cap and gown as the school uniform. The school created the position of a master to teach arithmetic and writing. The school continued to cater to poor pupils, requiring any boy who inherited £100 or more to leave to make way for a less lucky individual. However, the school began to run into financial difficulties; by 1714, the school had reduced itself to only eight pupils. Hardship continued until 1738 when the Court of Assistants, the senior governing body of the Haberdashers' Company, decided that the favourable condition of the company justified restoring the school. At the same time, caps and gowns ceased to be the school uniform, and the school removed Latin from the curriculum.

=== 1738–1825 ===
In 1818, the Charities Commission announced that the school's buildings required repairs that were too expensive for the company's allotted allowance. However, errors in bookkeeping reveal that, whereas it was thought that the school was £7,000 in debt to the company, they were in fact £900 in credit. By 1820 the schoolmaster's basic salary was still fixed at £15. However, the master at this time, William Webb, received gratuities of £20 in both 1818 and 1819. By contrast, the chaplain, matron, and nurse received £50, £16, and £12 respectively, and each of the two maidservants received a salary of £8. The pupil body continued to comprise 20 poor sons of freedmen, and the curriculum consisted of the three Rs (reading, writing, and arithmetic) and the catechism.

=== 1825–1874 ===
In 1825, the school erected new buildings on the site. The schoolmaster at this time was himself a former pupil of the school and a liveryman of the company. The company increased the school's allowance by £4 and expanded the school's collection of books. Regular examinations were conducted, with prizes provided for exceptional performance.

In the early days of the school, the chaplain and the schoolmaster both taught but had separate roles. However, in 1830, the school chaplain was dismissed following scandalous behaviour with a servant-girl. The school was temporarily closed, and when it re-opened in 1831, J. L. Turner was elected to take both roles and given a salary of £700, from which he had to pay for all costs of the school's management. He was forbidden to take pupils from paying parents. The school replaced the former reading, writing, and arithmetic curriculum with Latin (having removed it in 1738), geography, grammar, accounting, and mathematics. By the end of the year, Turner revealed he had spent £748, which exceeded his salary. However, the company committee was satisfied that the significant improvement in the boys' education merited an increase in funding to £800 per year. At this point, the school conducted examinations on a biannual basis.

In 1849, F. W. Mortimer, headmaster of the City of London School, criticized some of the textbooks used and the teaching of Latin, which he thought would be better replaced by French. In 1858, Thomas Grose, who conducted the school's examinations, echoed Mortimer's earlier criticisms of the study of Latin and repeated his suggestion that the school should teach French instead. In addition, he also recommended the introduction of geometry, business studies, trigonometry, mechanics, and natural philosophy to the curriculum. The schoolmaster at this time, Mr. Carterfield, resisted these suggestions. However, growing dissatisfaction among the school's older pupils led to his resignation later that year. A. Jones became headmaster, as the title had become known. In 1868, inhabitants of the surrounding area petitioned the school to accept the sons of parishioners as pupils.

In 1874, though not directly related to this school, two new schools, one for boys and one for girls, were set up in Hatcham, South London. They were known as the Haberdashers' Hatcham Schools until 1991, when the two were combined as Haberdashers' Hatcham College, now a state-funded academy.

=== 1874–1961 ===
In 1874, the almshouse, which had housed the school since 1690, closed to give the developing school more space. The school was divided into two halves, one for boys and one, for the first time, for girls. Each half admitted 300 pupils, a significant increase on previous pupil numbers; £5,000 was spent on renovating the Hoxton buildings; and the chaplain, schoolmaster, matron, and almsmen were pensioned. The foundationers were moved to another boarding school.

In 1883, the school increased the leaving age for pupils to 18. In 1898, the school moved the two-halves—the Girls' School to Acton and the boys' to a site just within Hampstead borough, in north-west London – but much closer to Cricklewood. Its formal name was the Haberdashers' Aske’s Hampstead School. A preparatory section for boys up to 11 years of age was located at Chase Lodge, Mill Hill. In the 1950s, the closure of Mercers School led to transferring a substantial number of boys to the Hampstead site.

=== 1961–1974 ===
In 1961, the Boysʼ School moved to its present site at Elstree, Hertfordshire, and was renamed Haberdashersʼ Askeʼs School, Elstree. In 1974, the Girls' School at Acton was reunited with its Boys' School counterpart on an adjacent site at Elstree.

Starting with the move to Elstree, like most public schools, Haberdashersʼ took several boarding pupils. In 1964, these numbered 75 pupils out of a total of 680 in the senior school. Since then, the school has reverted to being a day school with all pupils traveling in each day, mainly via an extensive school coach service.

=== 1974–present ===
More recently, several buildings on the Elstree campus have been opened, including the new Aske Building (2004), a multi-million-pound science and geography complex, and the Bourne Building, a classics series, information technology, history, and politics classrooms. The Bourne Building also houses the school's largest hall (the Bourne Hall) and the library.

Another significant building in Haberdashers' is the T. W. Taylor Music School (named after a former headmaster), containing at its centre the Seldon Hall (a concert hall), several classrooms used for class music lessons, and smaller tuition rooms used for individual (or small group) tuition in musical instruments. Every two to four years, the school hosts a concert at the Barbican in central London. The school has occasionally organised the concert in collaboration with the Girls' School next door. The director of performance music, Tom Taylor, is in charge of the concert.

The Bourne Building also features an assembly hall inherited from the building that previously stood there. This hall is home to a fine pipe organ, built-in 1897 by Henry Willis & Sons for Hove Town Hall and brought to Elstree in 1962. The instrument retains its original specification of 36 stops on four manuals and pedals and is maintained by the Willis firm.

As a result of discussion in 2021, Robert Aske's name was dropped from the boys’ and girls’ Haberdashers’ Schools in Elstree, due to his previous links with the slave trade; although it was retained by their governing body. At the same time, the school's motto was changed, from “Serve and Obey’ to “Together, boundless”. The motto reflected the Christian values of the school, not its links with slavery, but was seen to be inappropriate following the discovery.

The Hinton and Taylor buildings completed construction in 2022. They consist of 46 classrooms, academic offices and a drama studio.

== Overview ==
=== Buildings and grounds ===
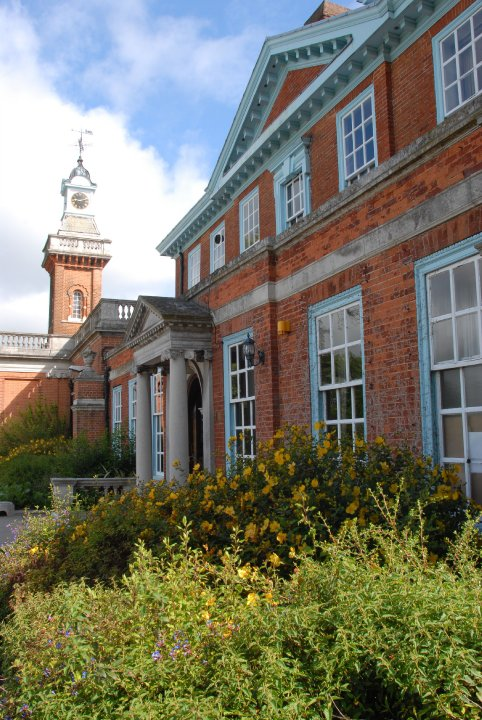
View of the Clock Tower from Aldenham House

Haberdashers’ is located on the grounds of Aldenham House, a stately home, which became the boarding house in 1961, with accommodation for 80 main school pupils, three staff, and their spouses. The Headmaster and his secretary have offices on the ground floor. Other administrative areas were housed there after boarding ended. Although the school uses the house for various purposes, teaching takes place in several buildings that have been built on the grounds, most built around the Quad, a rectangular area of grass that has restricted access to students.

At its centre is Aldenham House, a Grade II* listed building, that was formerly the seat of the Lords Aldenham and home to Vicary Gibbs MP. While the school once offered boarding to some students, it has since become an all-day school, with the boarding quarters having been converted to offices.

The Bourne Building, home to the largest of the school's assembly halls, the library, along with several history, ICT and classics classrooms, is next to Aldenham House at the top of the Quadrangle. The library was quite recently refurbished by the school and now contains various open and screened seating areas, as well as desktop and laptop computers. A team of qualified librarians supervises the library, which serves as pupils' principal work area.

On the opposite side of the Quad is the old Maths and MFL block, containing the Bates Dining Room and sixth form common room. To the left side of the Bourne Building is the Seldon (formerly TW Taylor) Music School which houses classrooms for the music department, instrumental lessons and a performance hall in the centre called the Seldon Hall which is also used for assemblies. Opposite the music school is the Aske Building, a complex of science and geography classrooms which also contains the Aske Hall used primarily for lectures given by visiting speakers.

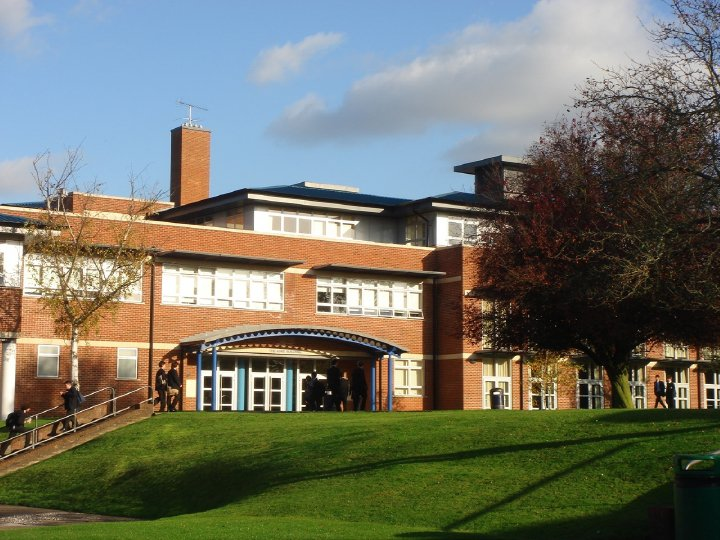
The Aske Building at Haberdashers' Aske's Boys' School

Behind the Aske Building, lies the recently constructed multi-purpose sports complex which was opened in 2016 and formally called the Medburn Centre, the complex boasts a 24.96m swimming pool, climbing wall, gymnasium, the Medburn Hall, squash courts, new changing rooms and Joe's Café in the lobby area. The complex was connected to the older McGowan Hall which is a large sports halls used for various activities as well as exams.

In June 2022, the school opened their 2 new buildings on site for core subjects, the Taylor and Hinton buildings, named after former headmasters of the school. The new buildings have state-of-the art classrooms and house the subjects: English, Theology and Philosophy and Modern Foreign Languages (in the Taylor) and Maths and Economics (in the Hinton). As part of the construction a new drama studio was constructed between the Taylor and Bourne buildings acting as a "bridge" and the grounds around these buildings have been uplifted from being an empty playground space with spaces like the "Lime Walk" and "Rain Garden". Behind the new buildings is the oldest building on site: the Design and Art Centre housing the DT and Art subjects. The lower floor has 3 distinct DT workshops and 2 DT computer labs for classes to use and the upper floor has four studios for drawing, painting, printing, sculpture, digital design, textiles and ceramics on top of a dedicated Sixth Form studio and Art and Design library.

On the other side of the school is the Prep School which was extended and renovated in 2019, the newly constructed Pre-Prep school which is set to be complete for October 2022, the Penne's Changing Rooms (which are for Rugby and Cricket players who are playing on the school fields). To the right side of the Penne's is the North Drive Car Park for teachers and support staff and to the left is the Coach Park, but in front of the Penne's is the main field area.

=== Academic attainment ===
The school admits pupils based upon a school-specific competitive examination (not the Common Entrance Paper) at either 11+ or 13+ (with entry into the preparatory school at 4+ or 7+). Oxbridge offers statistics are as follows:

2001	2002	2003	2004	2005	2006	2007	2008	2009	2010	2011	2012	2013	2014	2015	2016	2017	2018	2019	2020	2021	2022	2023
37	25	40	27	32	43	37	36	26	38	37	31	46	37	39	36	38	30	25	21	15	12	17

Older averages (2001–2006) placed the school at nineteenth in the country.

The school was ranked 15th by The Sunday Times in their 2006 Parent Power feature on the best independent schools, down from 12 in the previous year. According to the Times rankings, Habs came 12th (out of 1,150 schools) in GCSE rankings and 72nd (out of 939) at A-level, though this is largely because most boys at Habs only took three A-levels, and so received a lower total score than other comparable schools. In the same year, the Telegraph placed Habs in 15th place based on A- and AS-level results, and 8th (out of 2703) in their full list ranked by average score per A-level entry.

In the 2015 private school League tables, The Telegraph placed the School 10th in the country for GCSE and achieved a 74% overall A* grade. Similarly, at A-Level, the school gained several places and was listed at 7th in the country having received 83% A*-A grades.

For the main academic subjects taken by boys to GCSE (which consist of mathematics, the sciences, and English), IGCSE papers are written. Mathematics and the sciences use Edexcel IGCSE papers; The humanities – the school offers history, geography, and theology and philosophy – write the Cambridge International Examinations. The modern foreign languages department (MFL) also uses Cambridge International Examinations, apart from Spanish, which will start using the AQA specification from the 2024–25 year. Those pupils in the higher sets may sit an additional paper from the Institute of Linguistics.

=== Houses ===
The school sorts the boys into one of six school houses, each house having their own 'house colour' used on the standard and house ties worn by pupils:

- Calverts (orange, previously dark blue)
- Hendersons (red)
- Joblings (green)
- Meadows (purple)
- Russells (light blue)
- Strouts (yellow)

The names for these houses derive from the names of their original housemasters. While the school places pupils in tutor groups, these are purely for pastoral purposes and are taught in mixed, or streamed, sets. The school awards several shields at the end of the academic year for competitions between the houses. These shields include:

- Junior Work and Conduct
- Middle-School Work and Conduct
- Senior Work and Conduct
- The Crossman Shield, awarded for success in inter-house sporting competitions
- The Dunton Shield, awarded to the house with the highest number of points in the above four categories combined

Throughout the year, there are numerous inter-house events, including sporting and non-sporting competitions such as inter-house debating, inter-house chess, inter-house Scrabble, inter-house backgammon, and inter-house bridge, inter-house MasterChef, and inter-house target shooting. The school expects each boy to represent their house in at least one activity. However, many boys represent their houses in multiple activities.

In the preparatory and pre-preparatory schools, the houses are the following:

- Andrews (blue, representing Scotland)
- Davids (yellow, representing Wales)
- Georges (red, representing England)
- Patricks (green, representing Northern Ireland)

The house names represent the patron saints of the four countries of the United Kingdom (Scotland, Wales, England and Northern Ireland). Bands on students' ties reflect these house colours.

=== Fees ===
The total cost of attending the schools are stated below:

Year Group	Autumn 2024	Total Termly Fees Incl. VAT	Per Annum 2024-25
Pre-Preparatory School (Reception, Year 1 and Year 2)	£6,995.00	£7,974.00	£22,943.00
Preparatory School (Years 3, 4, 5 and 6)	£8,189.00	£9,336.00	£26,859.00
Senior School (Years 7, 8, 9, 10 and 11)	£8,666.00	£9,879.00	£28,424.00
Sixth Form (Years 12 and 13)	£8,666.00	£9,879.00	£28,424.00

The termly cost excludes extras such as coach fare, lunch, and instrumental lessons.

=== Coat of arms ===
The school's coat of arms and motto is lent by the Worshipful Company of Haberdashers. The arms are blazoned:

Barry wavy of six argent and azure on a bend gules a lion passant guardant Or, on a wreath argent and azure colours issuing from clouds two naked arms embowed holding a laurel wreath all proper, on either side a goat of India argent flecked gules and membered Or

Motto: Serve and Obey

These armorial bearings, including the crest of two arms holding a wreath, were granted to the Haberdashers' Company on 8 November 1570 by Robert Cooke, Clarenceux.

== Co-curricular activities ==
There are many pupil-run societies at Haberdashers', usually presided over by a teacher.

In 2010, two out of the four members of the England Worlds Competition debating team were pupils at Haberdashers', while two out of the four teams in the Oxford Union finals were from the school.

Pupils in year 10 and above may take part in the Haberdashers' detachment of the Combined Cadet Force (CCF). The CCF comprises Army, Royal Navy, and Royal Air Force sections. The corps takes cadets on a field day each term to participate in section-specific activities. Pupils in year 10 have the option to partake in Outdoor Leadership instead of CCF, or SCS (school community service). It is run by James Dunlop, and activities consist of Scuba Diving, Rock Climbing, Orienteering, as well as others.

Students who do not participate in the Combined Cadet Force or Outdoor Leadership are required to do school community service (SCS) once a week. This can range from helping out in local nursing homes to teaching skills such as debating to younger pupils. As with CCF, SCS is designed to encourage a sense of responsibility within a community and benefit other people both within and outside the school. Sport is a significant activity at the school, with a plethora of different teams and a wide array of sports, including cricket, rugby, fencing and squash. A new multi-million-pound sports complex was completed in January 2016, named the Medburn Centre.

== Other Haberdashers' Schools ==
- Haberdashers' School for Girls was established in Hoxton. It moved to Acton in 1898 and, in 1974, to its current location next to the Boys' School in Elstree.
- Haberdashers' Hatcham College, formerly Haberdashers' Aske's Hatcham Boys' & Girls' schools, based in New Cross, SE London.
- The Haberdashers' Company was also involved in the foundation of other schools such as the boarding Monmouth School. However, these are not associated with Robert Aske.
- Haberdashers' Crayford Academy, formerly Barnes Cray Primary School, based in Crayford, SE London.
- Haberdashers' Knights Academy, Bromley Kent

== Notable current and former staff members ==
- Laurence Broderick, sculptor, former head of Art
- John Dudderidge, Olympic canoeist, taught chemistry
- Julian Hails, former footballer, taught mathematics
- Jamie Hewitt, cricketer, teaches PE
- John Knight, former footballer, taught chemistry
- Clive Rees, former rugby player, taught PE
- David Thomas, Olympic hockey player, was director of PE
- Richard Wright (musician), Keyboard player and song writer with Pink Floyd
- Doug Yeabsley, former cricketer and rugby player, taught chemistry
- Wayne Thomas, former footballer, teaches PE
- Frederick Voigt Author/Ed of The Nineteenth Century and After,

== Controversies ==
In 2020, the former caretaker Justin Terry, 45, mixed cocaine with chemicals before pressing it inside his on-site lodge at Haberdashers' Aske's Boys' School, and was found by police with two kilo (2.2lb) blocks of the drug along with £37,000 cash hidden underneath his bed. He was jailed for 8 years.

== Other references ==
- J. S. Cockburn, H. P. F. King, K. G. T. McDonnell (1969) A History of the County of Middlesex. Volume 1: Physique, Archaeology, Domesday, Ecclesiastical Organization, The Jews, Religious Houses, Education of Working Classes to 1870, Private Education from Sixteenth Century. Boydell & Brewer (ISBN 978-0-19-722713-8)
- J. W. Wigley Serve and Obey, a History of the School
