= Social Security (United States) =

American retirement system

- Official Name: Old-Age, Survivors, and Disability Insurance (OASDI)
- Country: United States
- Introduced: August 14, 1935; 91 years ago
- Signed by: Franklin D. Roosevelt
- Administered by: Social Security Administration
- Funding source: Payroll taxes (FICA / SECA)
- Website: ssa.gov

In the United States, Social Security is the commonly used term for the federal Old-Age, Survivors, and Disability Insurance (OASDI) program and is administered by the Social Security Administration (SSA). The Social Security Act was passed in 1935, and the existing version of the Act, as amended, encompasses several social welfare and social insurance programs.

The average monthly Social Security benefit for May 2025 was $1,903. This was raised from $1,783 in 2024. The total cost of the Social Security program for 2022 was $1.244 trillion or about 5.2 percent of U.S. gross domestic product (GDP). In 2025, there have been proposed budget cuts to social security.

Social Security is funded primarily through payroll taxes called the Federal Insurance Contributions Act (FICA) or Self Employed Contributions Act (SECA). Wage and salary earnings from covered employment, up to an amount determined by law (see tax rate table), are subject to the Social Security payroll tax. Wage and salary earnings above this amount are not taxed. In 2026, the maximum amount of taxable earnings is $184,500.

Social Security is nearly universal, with 94 percent of individuals in paid employment in the United States working in covered employment. However, about 6.6 million state and local government workers in the United States, or 28 percent of all state and local workers, are not covered by Social Security but rather pension plans operated at the state or local level.

Social Security payroll taxes are collected by the federal Internal Revenue Service (IRS) and are formally entrusted to the Federal Old-Age and Survivors Insurance (OASI) Trust Fund and the federal Disability Insurance (DI) Trust Fund, the two Social Security Trust Funds. Social Security revenues exceeded expenditures between 1983 and 2009, which increased trust fund balances. The retirement of the large baby-boom generation, however, is lowering balances. The 2026 Social Security trustees projected that the Old-Age and Survivors Insurance Trust Fund would be depleted in the fourth quarter of 2032, when continuing program income would be sufficient to pay 78% of scheduled OASI benefits. On a hypothetical combined OASI and Disability Insurance basis, reserves were projected to be depleted in the third quarter of 2034, when 83% of scheduled benefits would be payable; the two funds cannot legally be combined without a change in law.

With few exceptions, all legal residents working in the United States have an individual Social Security Number.

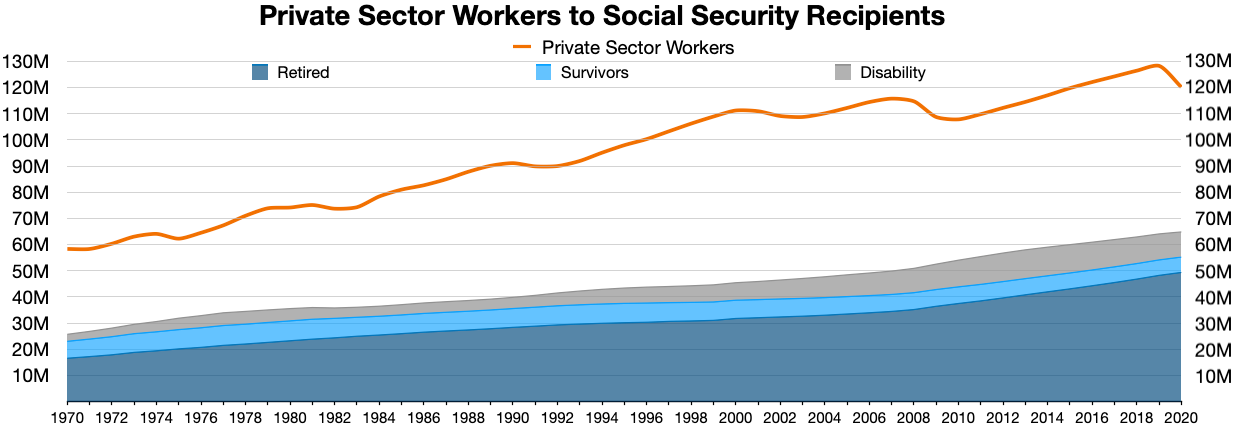
Private sector workers relative to social benefit recipients Private sector workers Disability recipients Survivors benefits Retired Social Security

== History ==
Historical Social Security Tax Rates Maximum Salary FICA or SECA taxes paid on
Year	Maximum Earnings taxed	OASDI Tax rate	Medicare Tax Rate	Year	Maximum Earnings taxed	OASDI Tax rate	Medicare Tax Rate
1937	$3,000	2%	—	1983	$35,700	10.8%	2.6%
1938	$3,000	2%	—	1984	$37,800	11.4%	2.6%
1939	$3,000	2%	—	1985	$39,600	11.4%	2.7%
1940	$3,000	2%	—	1986	$42,000	11.4%	2.9%
1941	$3,000	2%	—	1987	$43,800	11.4%	2.9%
1942	$3,000	2%	—	1988	$45,000	12.12%	2.9%
1943	$3,000	2%	—	1989	$48,000	12.12%	2.9%
1944	$3,000	2%	—	1990	$51,300	12.4%	2.9%
1945	$3,000	2%	—	1991	$53,400	12.4%	2.9%
1946	$3,000	2%	—	1992	$55,500	12.4%	2.9%
1947	$3,000	2%	—	1993	$57,600	12.4%	2.9%
1948	$3,000	2%	—	1994	$60,600	12.4%	2.9%
1949	$3,000	2%	—	1995	$61,200	12.4%	2.9%
1950	$3,000	3%	—	1996	$62,700	12.4%	2.9%
1951	$3,600	3%	—	1997	$65,400	12.4%	2.9%
1952	$3,600	3%	—	1998	$68,400	12.4%	2.9%
1953	$3,600	3%	—	1999	$72,600	12.4%	2.9%
1954	$3,600	4%	—	2000	$76,200	12.4%	2.9%
1955	$4,200	4%	—	2001	$80,400	12.4%	2.9%
1956	$4,200	4%	—	2002	$84,900	12.4%	2.9%
1957	$4,200	4.5%	—	2003	$87,000	12.4%	2.9%
1958	$4,200	4.5%	—	2004	$87,900	12.4%	2.9%
1959	$4,800	5%	—	2005	$90,000	12.4%	2.9%
1960	$4,800	6%	—	2006	$94,200	12.4%	2.9%
1961	$4,800	6%	—	2007	$97,500	12.4%	2.9%
1962	$4,800	6.25%	—	2008	$102,000	12.4%	2.9%
1963	$4,800	7.25%	—	2009	$106,800	12.4%	2.9%
1964	$4,800	7.25%	—	2010	$106,800	12.4%	2.9%
1965	$4,800	7.25%	—	2011	$106,800	10.4%	2.9%
1966	$6,600	7.7%	0.7%	2012	$110,100	10.4%	2.9%
1967	$6,600	7.8%	1.0%	2013	$113,700	12.4%	2.9%
1968	$7,800	7.6%	1.2%	2014	$117,000	12.4%	2.9%
1969	$7,800	8.4%	1.2%	2015	$118,500	12.4%	2.9%
1970	$7,800	8.4%	1.2%	2016	$118,500	12.4%	2.9%
1971	$7,800	9.2%	1.2%	2017	$127,200	12.4%	2.9%
1972	$9,000	9.2%	1.2%	2018	$128,400	12.4%	2.9%
1973	$10,800	9.7%	2.0%	2019	$132,900	12.4%	2.9%
1974	$13,200	9.9%	1.8%	2020	$137,700	12.4%	2.9%
1975	$14,100	9.9%	1.8%	2021	$142,800	12.4%	2.9%
1976	$15,300	9.9%	1.8%	2022	$147,000	12.4%	2.9%
1977	$16,500	9.9%	1.8%	2023	$160,200	12.4%	2.9%
1978	$17,700	10.1%	2.0%	2024	$168,600	12.4%	2.9%
1979	$22,900	10.16%	2.1%	2025	$176,100	12.4%	2.9%
1980	$25,900	10.16%	2.1%	2026	$184,500	12.4%	2.9%
1981	$29,700	10.7%	2.6%	2027	$192,300	12.4%	2.9%
1982	$32,400	10.8%	2.6%				
Notes: Tax rate is the sum of the OASDI and Medicare rate for employers and workers. In 2011 and 2012, the OASDI tax rate on workers was set temporarily to 4.2% while the employers OASDI rate remained at 6.2% giving 10.4% total rate. Medicare taxes of 2.9% have no taxable income ceiling since 2013. Sources: Social Security Administration

Social Security timeline

- 1935 The 37-page Social Security Act signed August 14 by President Franklin D. Roosevelt. The legislation included Unemployment Insurance, Aid to Dependent Children, Old Age Insurance (OAI), and Old Age Assistance (OAA). The old age insurance program gradually developed into the Old Age Survivors and Disability Insurance program, which is what Americans typically associate with "Social Security".
- 1936 The new Social Security Board contracts the Post Office Department in late November to distribute and collect applications, then produce and mail official cards with the nine-digit numbers.
- 1936 John Sweeney becomes the first American citizen to officially receive a social security number, with millions more by the end of 1936. Sweeney died in 1974 at the age of 61 years, so he never collected any social security retirement benefits, but his widow did receive benefits based on his payments.
- 1937 Income earned starting January 1 is subject to the Social Security payroll tax. More than twenty million Social Security Cards issued. Ernest Ackerman receives first lump-sum payout (17 cents) in January.
- 1939 Two new categories of beneficiaries added: spouse and minor children of a retired worker.
- 1940 First monthly benefit check issued to Ida May Fuller for $22.54.
- 1950 Benefits increased and cost of living adjustments (COLAs) made at irregular intervals – 77% COLA in 1950.
- 1954 Disability program added to Social Security.
- 1960 Flemming v. Nestor. Landmark U.S. Supreme Court ruling that affirmed that Congress has the power to amend and revise the schedule of benefits. The Court also ruled that recipients have no contractual right to receive payments.
- 1961 Early retirement age lowered to age 62 at reduced benefits.
- 1965 Medicare health care benefits added to Social security – twenty million joined in three years.
- 1966 Medicare payroll tax of 0.7% added to pay for increased Medicare expenses.
- 1972 Supplemental Security Income (SSI) program federalized and assigned to Social Security Administration.
- 1975 Automatic cost of living adjustments (COLAs) mandated.
- 1977 COLA adjustments brought back to "sustainable" levels.
- 1980 Amendments are made in disability program to help solve some problems of fraud.
- 1983 Taxation of Social Security benefits introduced, new federal hires required to be under Social Security, retirement age increased for younger workers to 66 and 67 years.
- 1984 Congress passed the Disability Benefits Reform Act modifying several aspects of the disability program.
- 1996 Drug addiction or alcoholism disability beneficiaries could no longer be eligible for disability benefits. The Earnings limit doubled the exemption amount for retired Social Security beneficiaries. Terminated SSI eligibility for most non-citizens.
- 1997 The law requires the establishment of federal standards for state-issued birth certificates and requires SSA to develop a prototype counterfeit-resistant Social Security card – still being worked on.
- 1997 Temporary Assistance for Needy Families, (TANF), replaces Aid to Families with Dependent Children (AFDC) program placed under SSA.
- 1997 State Children's Health Insurance Program for low income citizens – SCHIP added to Social Security Administration (SSA).
- 2003 Voluntary drug benefits with supplemental Medicare insurance payments from recipients added.
- 2009 No Social Security Benefits for Prisoners Act of 2009 signed.

A limited form of the Social Security program began, during President Franklin D. Roosevelt's first term, as a measure to implement "social insurance" during the Great Depression of the 1930s. The Act was an attempt to limit unforeseen and unprepared-for dangers in modern life, including old age, disability, poverty, unemployment, and the burdens of widow(er)s with and without children.

Opponents, however, decried the proposal as socialism. Secretary of Labor Frances Perkins wrote that during a Senate Finance Committee hearing, Senator Thomas Gore (D-OK) asked "Isn't this Socialism?" She replied that it was not, but he continued, "Isn't this a teeny-weeny bit of Socialism?"

The provisions of Social Security have been changing since the 1930s, shifting in response to economic worries as well as coverage for the poor, dependent children, spouses, survivors and the disabled. Poor farms were common in the US before Social Security took effect, then most disappeared by about 1950. By 1950, debates moved away from which occupational groups should be included to get enough taxpayers to fund Social Security to how to provide more benefits. Changes in Social Security have reflected a balance between promoting "equality" and efforts to provide "adequate" and affordable protection for low wage workers.

== Major programs ==
The larger and better known programs under the Social Security Act are:

- Federal Old-Age (Retirement), Survivors, and Disability Insurance, OASDI
- Temporary Assistance for Needy Families, TANF
- Health Insurance for Aged and Disabled, Medicare
- Grants to States for Medical Assistance Programs for low income citizens, Medicaid
- State Children's Health Insurance Program for low income citizens, SCHIP
- Supplemental Security Income, SSI

The SSA administers two of these programs (OASDI and SSI).

Major Programs Under the Social Security Act
Program Name	Abbreviation	Administered by SSA?	Target Audience / Purpose
Federal Old-Age, Survivors, and Disability Insurance	OASDI	Yes	Retirement, survivors, and disability insurance
Temporary Assistance for Needy Families	TANF	No	Financial assistance for needy families
Health Insurance for Aged and Disabled	Medicare	No	Health insurance for the aged and disabled
Grants to States for Medical Assistance Programs	Medicaid	No	Medical assistance for low-income citizens
State Children's Health Insurance Program	SCHIP	No	Health insurance for low-income children
Supplemental Security Income	SSI	Yes	Financial support for low-income aged, blind, or disabled individuals

== Benefits ==
=== Benefit types ===
The Social Security program in the United States pays benefits to three broad categories of individuals: retired individuals and some family members, disabled persons and some family members, and survivors. Within these broad categories, the program defines more specific types of beneficiaries. For example, spouses and divorced spouses are distinct categories, with somewhat different eligibility requirements. Survivor benefits include several categories including aged widow(er)s, aged surviving divorced spouses, disabled widow(er)s, disabled surviving divorced spouses, paternal and maternal orphans, and widow(er)s caring for minor or disabled children.

As of 2023, there were about 66.8 million individuals receiving Social Security benefits. Individuals receiving Retirement Insurance Benefits constitute the largest group of beneficiaries, with 52.4 million retired workers or family members receiving monthly payments. Social Security Disability Insurance benefits were paid to 7.4 million disabled workers and 1.2 million dependents (children and spouses). About 5.8 million individuals, including 2 million children, received some type of survivor benefit from Social Security.

Some individuals qualify for more than one type of benefit, but program rules on dual entitlement generally prevent the payment of two full benefits. For example, a person eligible for a retirement benefit and a higher spouse benefit will receive the full retirement benefit and a partial spouse benefit. The dual entitlement rules disproportionately affect women (7 million women in 2022) because historically they have earned less than current or former husbands and this leads to retirement benefits for women that are often lower than the full spouse benefit for which they qualify.

In addition, Social Security beneficiaries with low income and limited resources may qualify for additional income through the Supplemental Security Income (SSI) program. SSI is separate from the Social Security program, but it is administered by SSA. In 2022, 2.5 million Social Security beneficiaries received additional income through SSI.

=== System financing ===
Social Security payments to beneficiaries, which totaled $1.23 trillion in 2022, are generally financed by payroll taxes on workers in Social Security covered employment, trust fund reserves, and income taxation of some Social Security benefits. The payroll tax rate totals 12.4 percent of earnings up to the taxable maximum (the rate is 6.2 percent from workers and 6.2 percent from employers and 12.4 percent from the self-employed).

The OASI Trust Fund and the DI Trust Fund are legally separate. For employees and employers combined, the OASI payroll taxes are 10.6 percent and the DI payroll taxes are 1.8 percent. In 2022, trust fund reserves for the OASI and DI programs were $2.7 trillion and $118 billion, respectively. Income taxation of some Social Security benefits brought in $47.1 billion for OASI and $1.6 billion for DI in 2022.

Assessments of system financing often focus on the combined programs together (OASI and DI) and focus on key measures such as trust fund depletion date, actuarial balance over a 75-year period, and comparisons of program costs to U.S. GDP.

Regarding trust fund depletion, the Social Security Trustees in 2024, based on technical work by the Social Security Administration's actuaries, project the combined OASDI trust fund will be depleted in 2035. In 2021, the Penn Wharton Budget Model (University of Pennsylvania) projected depletion in 2032–2034, depending on the shape of the economic recovery in the U.S. following the COVID-19 pandemic.

With regard to actuarial balance, the Social Security Trustees estimate a 75-year actuarial deficit of 3.61 percent of payroll. This is approximately the total payroll tax increase that would be necessary to keep the system solvent for 75 years. The figure is designed to illustrate the size of the deficit. Legislation could close the deficit in ways other than raising the payroll tax rate.

Because taxable earnings are a fraction of GDP, sometimes the system's finances are put into context by using GDP. Social Security's cost are 5.2 percent of U.S. GDP as of 2023. Program costs will rise to 6.3 percent of GDP by 2076, and then decline to 6.0 percent of GDP by 2097.

In the past, legislation has been enacted to prevent trust fund depletion. Should the trust funds be depleted, Social Security would still have revenue coming into the system from payroll taxes. The Social Security trustees estimate that revenue would be sufficient to pay 77 percent of the program's benefits. There has been debate about a trust fund depletion scenario regarding whether monthly benefits would be lowered or whether full amounts would be paid but not on a timely basis.

The amount of the monthly Social Security benefit to which a worker is entitled depends upon the earnings record on which they have paid FICA or SECA taxes and upon the age at which the retiree chooses to begin receiving benefits. That said, the U.S. Supreme Court ruled in Flemming v. Nestor (1960) that no one has a contractual right to Social Security benefits.

Medicare is a separate program from Social Security, although disabled and aged (65 or older) Social Security beneficiaries qualify for Medicare. The financing for Medicare (United States) is also based on payroll taxes, trust fund reserves, and the taxation of some Social Security benefits.

=== Total benefits paid, by year ===
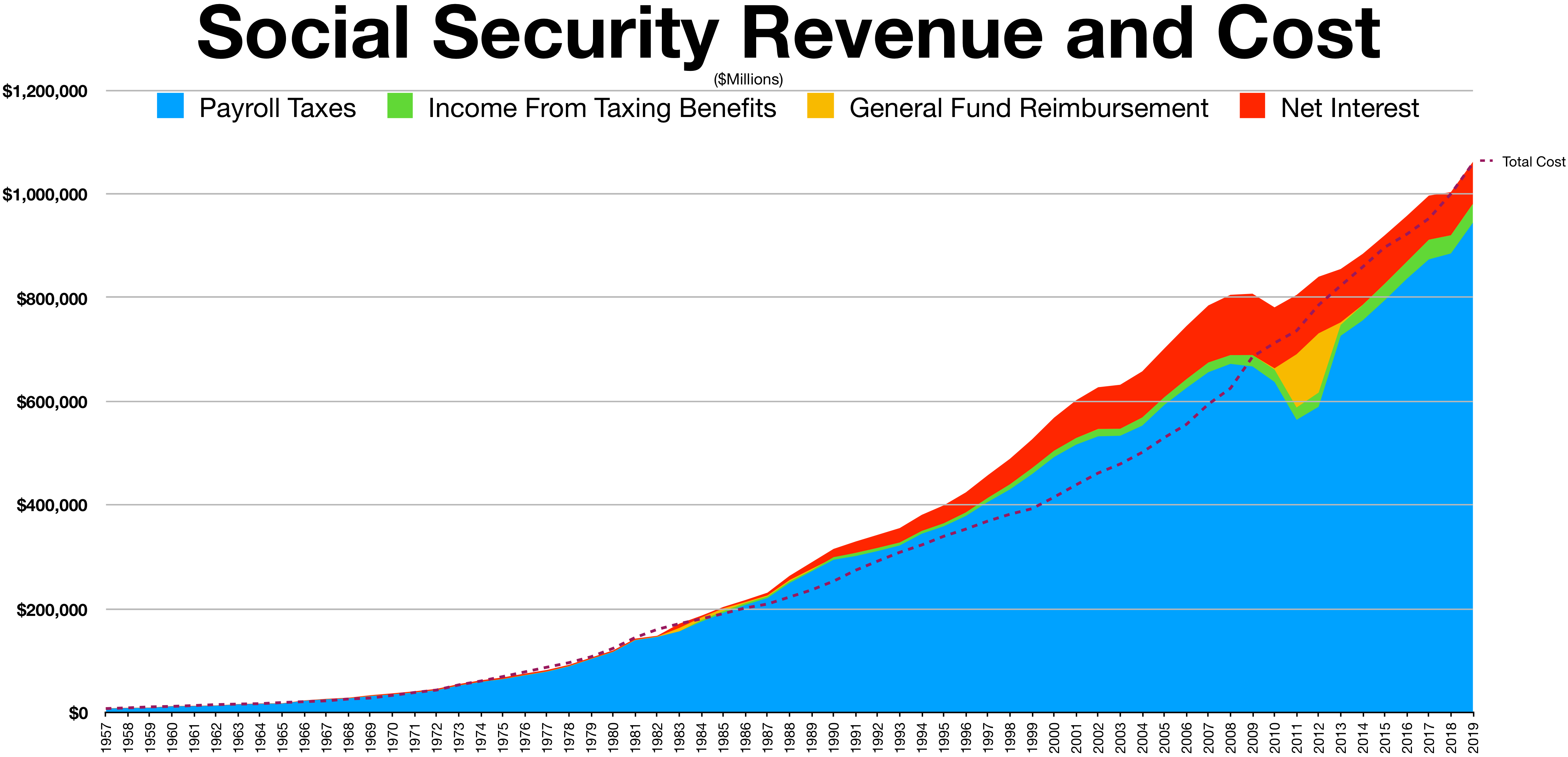
Annual cost is shown as a dotted line, first exceeding total revenues (including interest) in 2018

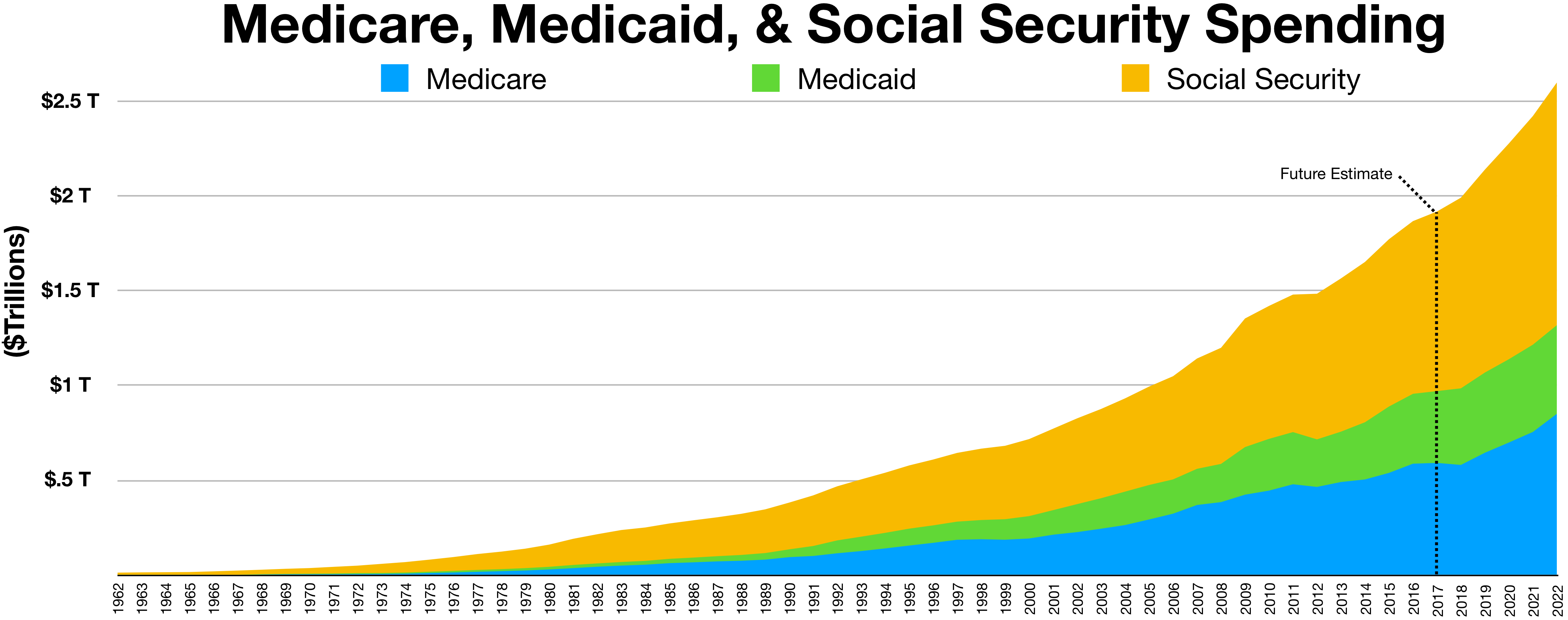
2017 and later are estimated

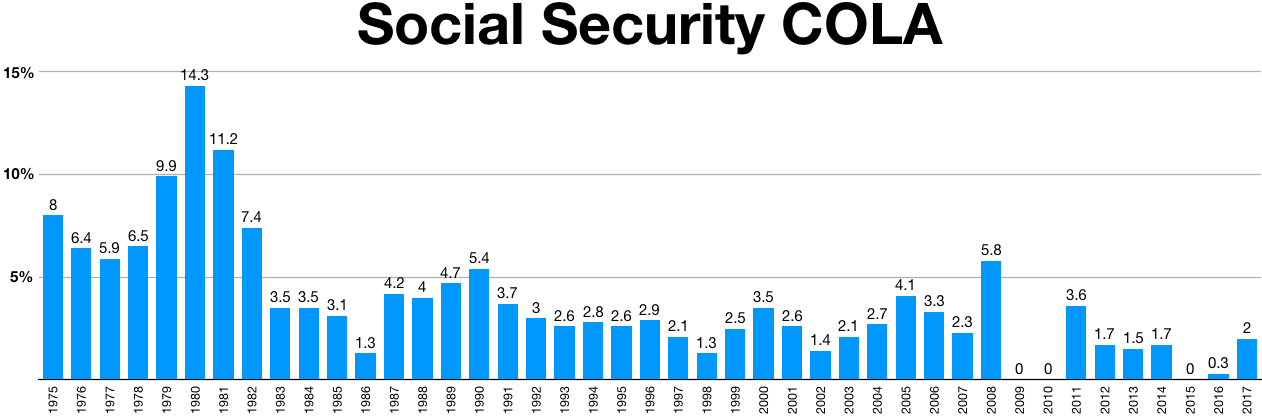
Increased Cost of Living Adjustments paid to recipients

Year	Beneficiaries	Dollars
1937	53,236	$1,278,000
1938	213,670	$10,478,000
1939	174,839	$13,896,000
1940	222,488	$35,000,000
1950	3,477,243	$961,000,000
1960	14,844,589	$11,245,000,000
1970	26,228,629	$31,863,000,000
1980	35,584,955	$120,511,000,000
1990	39,832,125	$247,796,000,000
1995	43,387,259	$332,553,000,000
1996	43,736,836	$347,088,000,000
1997	43,971,086	$361,970,000,000
1998	44,245,731	$374,990,000,000
1999	44,595,624	$385,768,000,000
2000	45,414,794	$407,644,000,000
2001	45,877,506	$431,949,000,000
2002	46,444,317	$453,746,000,000
2003	47,038,486	$470,778,000,000
2004	47,687,693	$493,263,000,000
2005	48,434,436	$520,748,000,000
2006	49,122,624	$546,238,000,000
2007	49,864,838	$584,939,000,000
2008	50,898,244	$615,344,000,000
2009	52,522,819	$675,482,000,000
2010	54,031,968	$701,609,000,000
2011	55,404,480	$725,103,000,000
2012	56,758,185	$774,791,000,000
2013	57,978,610	$812,259,000,000
2014	59,007,158	$848,463,000,000
2015	60,907,307	$886,278,000,000
2016	60,907,307	$911,384,000,000
2017	61,903,360	$941,499,000,000
2018	62,906,222	$988,635,000,000
2019	64,064,496	$1,047,930,000,000

=== Primary Insurance Amount and Monthly Benefit Amount calculations ===
Workers in Social Security covered employment pay FICA (Federal Insurance Contributions Act) or SECA (Self Employed Contributions Act) taxes and earn quarters of coverage if earnings are above minimum amounts specified in the law. Workers with 40 quarters of coverage (QC) are "fully insured" and eligible for retirement benefits. Retirement benefit amounts depend upon the average of the person's highest 35 years of "adjusted [for inflation]" or "indexed [for inflation]" earnings. A person's payroll-taxable earnings from earlier years are adjusted for economy-wide wage growth, using the national average wage index (AWI), and then averaged. If the worker has fewer than 35 years of covered earnings, these non-contributory years are assigned zero earnings. The sum of the highest 35 years of adjusted or indexed earnings divided by 420 (35 years times 12 months per year) produces a person's Average Indexed Monthly Earnings or AIME.

The AIME is then used to calculate the Primary Insurance Amount (PIA). For workers who turn 62 in 2024, the PIA computation formula is:

(a) 90 percent of the first $1,174 of average indexed monthly earnings, plus

(b) 32 percent of average indexed monthly earnings between $1,174 and $7,078, plus

(c) 15 percent of average indexed monthly earnings over $7,078

For workers who turn 62 in the future, the 90, 32, and 15 percent factors in the computation formula will remain the same but the dollar amounts in the formula (called bend points) will increase by wage growth in the national economy, as measured by the AWI. Because the AIME and the PIA calculation incorporate the AWI, Social Security benefits are said to be wage indexed. Because wages typically grow faster than prices, the PIAs for workers turning 62 in the future will tend to be higher in real terms but similar relative to average earnings in the economy at the time age 62 is attained.

Monthly benefit amounts are based on the PIA. Once the PIA is computed, it is indexed for price inflation over time. Thus, Social Security monthly benefit amounts retain their purchasing power throughout a person's retirement years.

A worker who first starts receiving a retirement benefit at the full retirement age receives a monthly benefit amount equal to 100 percent of the PIA. A worker who claims the retirement benefit before the full retirement age receives a reduced monthly benefit amount and a worker who claims at an age after the full retirement age (up to age 70) receives an increased monthly amount.

The 90, 32, and 15 percent factors in the PIA computation lead to higher replacement rates for persons with lower career earnings. For example, a retired individual whose average earnings are below the first bend point can receive a monthly benefit at the full retirement age that equals 90 percent of the person's average monthly earnings before retirement. The table shows replacement rates for workers who turned 62 in 2013.

Benefit Calculations Social Security Benefits vs. 35-year "Averaged" Salary Percent of Average Indexed Monthly Earnings (AIME) eligible for Social Security, PIA Benefits
AIME Salary per month	Single Benefits	Married Benefits^{*}	Single Benefits at age 62	Married Benefits^{*} at age 62
$ 791	90%	135%	68%	101%
$ 1,000	78%	117%	58%	88%
$ 2,000	55%	82%	41%	62%
$ 3,000	47%	71%	35%	53%
$ 4,000	43%	65%	33%	49%
$ 5,000	40%	60%	30%	45%
$ 6,000	36%	54%	27%	41%
$ 7,000	33%	50%	25%	32%
$ 8,000	31%	46%	23%	35%
$ 9,000	29%	44%	22%	33%
$10,000	28%	42%	21%	31%
$11,000	23%	34%	17%	26%
$12,000	21%	32%	16%	24%
$13,000	19%	29%	15%	22%
* Married spousal benefits may be reduced or eliminated if spouse receiving a government pension. Spouse still eligible for Medicare. Maximum percent of salary received before Medicare or tax deductions. Retirement benefits are calculated at full retirement ages. Age 62 retirement benefits are assumed to be 75% of full benefits. Approximate AIME salary = 90% salary. Approximation only; contact Social Security for more detailed calculations.

The PIA computation formula for disabled workers parallels that for retired workers except the AIME is based on fewer years to reflect disablement before age 62. The monthly benefit amount of a disabled worker is 100 percent of PIA.

Benefits for spouses, children, and widow(er)s depend on the PIAs of a spouse or a deceased spouse. Aged spouse and divorced spouse beneficiaries can receive up to 50 percent of the PIA. Survivor benefit rates are higher and aged widow(er)s and aged surviving divorced spouses can receive 100 percent of the PIA.

Federal, state and local employees who have elected (when they could) NOT to pay FICA taxes are eligible for a reduced FICA benefits and full Medicare coverage if they have more than forty quarters of qualifying Social Security covered work. To minimize the Social Security payments to those who have not contributed to FICA for 35+ years and are eligible for federal, state and local benefits, which are usually more generous, the U.S. Congress passed the Windfall Elimination Provision (WEP). The WEP provision does not eliminate all Social Security or Medicare eligibility if the worker has 40 quarters of qualifying income, but calculates the benefit payments by reducing the 90% multiplier in the first PIA bendpoint to 40–85% depending on the number of Years of Coverage. Foreign pensions are subject to WEP.

A special minimum benefit, based on an alternative PIA calculation, is available for some workers with long careers but low earnings. However, it is rarely higher than the regularly computed PIA and thus few workers qualify for the special minimum benefit. 32,000 individuals received the special minimum benefit in 2019.

The benefits someone is eligible for are potentially so complicated that potential retirees should consult the Social Security Administration directly for advice. Many questions are addressed and at least partially answered on many online publications and online calculators.

=== How workers can get estimates of benefits ===
Remaining life expectancy—expected number of remaining years of life as a function of current age—is used in retirement income planning.

The Social Security Administration (SSA) provides benefit estimates to workers through the Social Security Statement. The Statement can be accessed online by opening an online account with SSA called my Social Security. With that account, workers can also construct "what if" scenarios, helping them to understand the effect on monthly benefits if they work additional years or delay the start of retirement benefits. The my Social Security account also offers other services, allowing individuals to request a replacement Social Security card or check the status of an application.

A printed copy of the Social Security Statement is mailed to workers age 60 or older.

In 2021, SSA began producing Retirement Ready fact sheets, available online and as part of the online Statement, that tailor retirement planning information to different age groups (young, middle age, and older workers).

SSA also has a Benefits Calculators web page with several stand-alone online calculators that help individuals estimate their benefits and prepare for retirement. These include benefit calculators for spouses, calculators for persons affected by the Windfall Elimination Provision or the Government Pension Offset and calculators to determine a person's full retirement age or the effect of the earnings test on benefits.

SSA also provides a life expectancy calculator to help with retirement planning.

=== Full retirement age (FRA) ===
If a person first claims a retirement benefit at the full retirement age (FRA), the individual will receive a monthly benefit amount equal to 100 percent of the individual's primary insurance amount (PIA). If first claimed before the FRA, the monthly benefit amount is smaller than 100 percent of PIA and if claimed after the FRA the monthly amount is higher than 100 percent of PIA. Sometimes the full retirement age is referred to as the normal retirement age.

Historically, the FRA was age 65. The 1983 Amendments to the Social Security Act gradually increased the FRA and, for individuals born in 1960 or later, the FRA is 67. The early retirement age (age 62) has not changed, but the monthly benefit amount paid at the early retirement age is lower if a person has a higher FRA. For example, when the FRA was age 65, the early retirement benefit was 80 percent of the worker's PIA. For a person with a FRA of 67, the early retirement benefit is 70 percent of PIA.

Year of birth	Full retirement age
1937 & prior	65
1938	65 and 2 months
1939	65 and 4 months
1940	65 and 6 months
1941	65 and 8 months
1942	65 and 10 months
1943–1954	66
1955	66 and 2 months
1956	66 and 4 months
1957	66 and 6 months
1958	66 and 8 months
1959	66 and 10 months
1960 & later	67

Individuals who first claim retirement benefits after the FRA (and up to age 70) receive delayed retirement credits that increase the monthly benefit amount by 8 percent per year of delayed claiming. For example, if a person has a FRA of 67 and waits until age 70 to claim retirement benefits, the individual's monthly benefit amount will be 124 percent of PIA.

Age when filing	Change in benefits from full amount
62	-30%
63	-25%
64	-20%
65	-13.3%
66	-6.7
67	----
68	+8%
69	+16%
70	+24%
Based on a full retirement age of 67

When a retirement beneficiary dies, a widow(er) or surviving divorced spouse is generally eligible for a monthly benefit amount equal to that received by the retirement beneficiary. Thus, a worker who delays retirement increases both the monthly benefit amount of the retirement benefit and, ultimately, the benefit a survivor receives.

Many press articles, guides, and studies have focused on whether it is optimal to claim benefits at the full retirement age or some other age. The Social Security Administration produces a publication called "When to Start Receiving Retirement Benefits" that is designed to help individuals understand the issues involved in deciding when to begin benefits. The Center for Retirement Research at Boston College produced a guide designed to help individuals make informed claiming decisions.

Between 1985 and 2015, claiming of retirement benefits at the early retirement age became much less common and claiming at the full retirement age or later more common. In 2019, 1 in 4 individuals claimed at the early retirement age. From 2009 through 2019, the percentage of men claiming retirement benefits after the full retirement age increased from 4.1 percent to 16.2 percent. The effects of the COVID-19 pandemic and ensuing recession and recovery on benefit claiming, however, are not yet known.

The full retirement age is relevant for some benefit types other than retirement benefits. For example, aged spouses and aged survivors who claim spouse or survivor benefits before the full retirement age receive reduced spouse or survivor benefits. The increase in the full retirement age from the 1983 Amendments to the Social Security Act was phased in at a slightly different pace for survivor benefits and the full retirement age is 67 for survivors born in 1962 or later. Many aged survivors, however, are well past the full retirement age when the worker dies and thus can receive full survivor benefits immediately upon the worker's death.

For some types of Social Security benefits, benefits are not reduced or increased based on the age the benefits are first claimed. For example, a full monthly benefit amount (100 percent of PIA) is paid to disabled workers regardless of the age at which benefits start. At the full retirement age, the Social Security Administration reclassifies disabled workers as retired workers but the individual's monthly benefit amount is not affected.

=== Delayed benefits ===
Delayed Social Security Increases for retiring after full retirement age
Year of birth	Yearly % increase	Monthly % increase
1933–1934	5.5%	11/24 of 1%
1935–1936	6.0%	1/2 of 1%
1937–1938	6.5%	13/24 of 1%
1939–1940	7.0%	7/12 of 1%
1941–1942	7.5%	5/8 of 1%
1943+	8.0%	2/3 of 1%

If a worker delays receiving Social Security retirement benefits until after they reach full retirement age, the benefit will increase by two-thirds of one percent of the PIA per month. After age 70 there are no more increases as a result of delaying benefits. Social Security uses an "average" survival rate at your full retirement age to prorate the increase in the amount of benefit increase so that the total benefits are roughly the same whenever a person retires. Women may benefit more than men from this delayed benefit increase since the "average" survival rates are based on both men and women and women live approximately three years longer than men. The other consideration is that workers have a limited number of years of "good" health left after they reach full retirement age and unless they enjoy their job they may be passing up an opportunity to do something else they may enjoy doing while they are still relatively healthy.

=== Benefits while continuing work ===
Due to changing needs or personal preferences, a person may go back to work after retiring. In this case, it is possible to get Social Security retirement or survivors benefits and work at the same time. A worker who is of full retirement age or older may (with spouse) keep all benefits, after taxes, regardless of earnings. But, if this worker or the worker's spouse are younger than full retirement age and receiving benefits and earn "too much", the benefits will be reduced. If working under full retirement age for the entire year and receiving benefits, SSA deducts $1 from the worker's benefit payments for every $2 earned above the annual limit of $15,120 (2013). Deductions cease when the benefits have been reduced to zero and the worker will get one more year of income and age credit, slightly increasing future benefits at retirement. For example, if a person was receiving benefits of $1,230/month (the average benefit paid) or $14,760 a year and have an income of $29,520/year above the $15,120 limit ($44,640/year) that person would lose all ($14,760) benefits. If a person made $1,000 more than $15,200/year they would lose $500 in benefits. People got no benefits for the months they worked until the $1 deduction for $2 income "squeeze" is satisfied. First social security checks are delayed for several months – the first check may be only a fraction of the "full" amount. The benefit deductions change in the year a person reaches full retirement age and are still working – SSA deducts only one dollar in benefits for every three a person earns above $40,080 in 2013 for that year and has no deduction thereafter. The income limits change (presumably for inflation) year by year.

=== Spouse's benefits ===
The spouse or divorced spouse of a retirement beneficiary is eligible for a Social Security spouse benefit if the spouse or divorced spouse is 62 or older. The benefit amount is equal to 50 percent of the retirement beneficiary's Primary Insurance Amount (PIA) if the spouse claims the benefit at the full retirement age or later. If a person is eligible for both a retirement benefit based on the person's own work in Social Security covered employment and a spouse benefit based on a spouse's work in covered employment, SSA will pay a total amount approximately equal to the higher of the two benefits. For example, if at the full retirement age, a spouse claims a retirement benefit of $300 and a spouse benefit of $450, SSA will pay the person a $300 retirement benefit and a $150 partial spouse benefit for a total benefit of $450.

A spouse is eligible after a one-year duration of marriage requirement is met and a divorced spouse is eligible for spousal benefits if the marriage lasted for at least ten years and the person applying is not currently married. Payment of benefits to a divorced spouse does not reduce the Social Security benefits of the retired worker or family members of the retired worker, such as the worker's current spouse. A divorced person can claim spousal benefits once the former spouse is eligible for retirement benefits, regardless of whether the former spouse has claimed those retirement benefits.

Spousal benefits are reduced if claimed before the full retirement age. The reduction is 25/36 of 1% per month for the first 36 months and 5/12 of 1% for each additional month earlier than the full retirement age. This typically works out to between 50% and 32.5% of the retirement beneficiary's Primary Insurance Amount. There is no increase for starting spousal benefits after the full retirement age.

Although Social Security rules are gender-neutral, spousal benefits are disproportionately paid to women. Because of trends in marriage and workforce participation, retirement benefits are projected to become increasingly important for women, but spouse and survivor benefits will remain common.

Because spouse benefits are a 50 percent benefit and because divorced individuals do not share resources with a current husband or wife, divorced spouse beneficiaries have poverty rates that are high. About 29 percent of divorced spouse beneficiaries are in poverty compared to only about 5.4 percent of married spouse beneficiaries.

There was a Social Security government pension offset that would reduce or eliminate any spousal (or ex-spouse) or widow(er)'s benefits if the spouse or widow(er) is also receiving a government (federal, state, or local) pension from work that did not require paying Social Security taxes. It was repealed by the Social Security Fairness Act of 2023 (H.R. 82), which President Biden signed on January 5, 2025. The basic rule was that Social Security benefits would be reduced by two-thirds of the spouse's or widow(er)'s government pension. If the spouse's or widow(er)'s government pension exceeds 150% of the "normal" spousal or widow(er)'s benefit, the spousal benefit was eliminated. For example, a "normal" spousal or widow(er)'s benefit of $1,000/month was reduced to $0.00, if the spouse or widow(er) was already drawing a non-FICA taxed government pension of $1,500 or more per month. Pensions from work where Social Security taxes were paid, did not reduce Social Security spousal or widow(er)'s benefits. Pensions received from foreign countries did not cause GPO; however, a foreign pension used to be subject to the WEP.

=== Widow(er) benefits ===
If a worker covered by Social Security dies, a surviving spouse can receive survivors' benefits if a 9-month duration of marriage is met. If a widow(er) waits until Full Retirement Age, they are eligible for 100 percent of their deceased spouse's PIA. If the death of the worker was accidental, the duration of marriage test may be waived. A divorced spouse may qualify if the duration of marriage was at least ten full years and the widow(er) is not currently married, or remarried after attainment of age 60 (50 if disabled and eligible for specific types of benefits prior to the date of marriage).

A father or mother of any age with a child age 16 or under or a disabled adult child in their care may be eligible for benefits. The earliest age for a non-disabled widow(er)'s benefit is age 60. If the worker received retirement benefits prior to death, the benefit amount may not exceed the amount the worker was receiving at the time of death or 82.5% of the PIA of the deceased worker (whichever is more). If the surviving spouse starts benefits before full retirement age, there is an actuarial reduction. If the worker earned delayed retirement credits by waiting to start benefits after their full retirement age, the surviving spouse will have those credits applied to their benefit. If the worker died before the year of attainment of age 62, the earnings will be indexed to the year in which the surviving spouse attained age 60.

=== Children's benefits ===
Children of a retired, disabled or deceased worker receive benefits as a "dependent" or "survivor" if they are under the age of 18, or as long as attending primary or secondary school up to age 19 years and 2 months; or are over the age of 18 and were disabled before the age of 22.

The benefit for a child on a living parent's record, is 50% of the PIA. For a surviving child, the benefit is 75% of the PIA. The benefit amount may be reduced if total benefits on the record exceed the family maximum.

In Astrue v. Capato (2012), the Supreme Court unanimously held that children conceived after a parent's death (by in vitro fertilization procedure) are not entitled to Social Security survivors' benefits if the laws of the state in which the parent's will was signed do not provide for such benefits.

=== Disability ===
A worker who has worked long enough and recently enough (based on "quarters of coverage" within the recent past) to be covered can receive disability benefits. These benefits start after five full calendar months of disability, regardless of their age. The eligibility formula requires a certain number of credits (based on earnings) to have been earned overall, and a certain number within the ten years immediately preceding the disability, but with more-lenient provisions for younger workers who become disabled before having had a chance to compile a long earnings history.

The worker must be unable to continue in their previous job and unable to adjust to other work, with age, education, and work experience taken into account; furthermore, the disability must be long-term, lasting twelve months, expected to last twelve months, resulting in death, or expected to result in death. As with the retirement benefit, the amount of the disability benefit payable depends on the worker's age and record of covered earnings.

Supplemental Security Income (SSI) uses the same disability criteria as the insured social security disability program, but SSI is not based upon insurance coverage. Instead, a system of means-testing is used to determine whether the claimants' income and net worth fall below certain income and asset thresholds.

Severely disabled children may qualify for SSI. Standards for child disability are different from those for adults.

Disability determination at the Social Security Administration has created the largest system of administrative courts in the United States. Depending on the state of residence, a claimant whose initial application for benefits is denied can request reconsideration or a hearing before an Administrative Law Judge (ALJ). Such hearings sometimes involve participation of an independent vocational expert (VE) or medical expert (ME), as called upon by the ALJ.

Reconsideration involves a re-examination of the evidence and, in some cases, the opportunity for a hearing before a (non-attorney) disability hearing officer. The hearing officer decides the case and provides justification for the finding in writing. If the claimant is denied at the reconsideration stage, (s)he may request a hearing before an ALJ. In some states, SSA has implemented a pilot program that eliminates the reconsideration step and allows claimants to appeal an initial denial directly to an ALJ.

Because the number of applications for Social Security disability is large (approximately 650,000 applications per year), the number of hearings requested by claimants often exceeds the capacity of ALJs. The number of hearings requested and availability of ALJs varies geographically across the United States. In some areas of the country, it is possible for a claimant to have a hearing with an ALJ within 90 days of the request. In other areas, waiting times of 18 months are not uncommon.

After the hearing, the Administrative Law Judge (ALJ) issues a decision in writing. The decision can be Fully Favorable (the ALJ finds the claimant disabled as of the date that (s)he alleges in the application through the present), Partially Favorable (the ALJ finds the claimant disabled at some point, but not as of the date alleged in the application; OR the ALJ finds that the claimant was disabled but has improved), or Unfavorable (the ALJ finds that the claimant was not and is not disabled). Claimants can appeal decisions to the Social Security Appeals Council, which is in Virginia. The Appeals Council does not hold hearings; it accepts written briefs. Response time from the Appeals Council can range from twelve weeks to more than three years.

Claimants who disagree with the Appeals Council decision can appeal the case in federal district court. As in most federal court cases, an unfavorable district court decision can be appealed to the appropriate United States Court of Appeals, and an unfavorable appellate court decision can be appealed to the United States Supreme Court.

The SSA has maintained its goal for judges to resolve 500–700 cases per year but ALJs struggle to meet this goal. While 81% of ALJs met this productivity level in 2019, only 18% achieved this case disposition target in 2020. Office of Hearing Operations staffing and work procedure disruptions related to the COVID-19 pandemic have doubtlessly contributed to lower ALJ productivity in 2020.

The debate about the social security system in the United States has been ongoing for decades and there is concern about its sustainability.

== Current operation ==
=== Joining and quitting ===
Obtaining a Social Security number for a child is voluntary. Further, there is no general legal requirement that individuals join the Social Security program unless they want, or have, to work. Under normal circumstances, FICA taxes or SECA taxes will be collected on all wages. About the only way to avoid paying either FICA or SECA taxes is to join a religion that does not believe in insurance, such as the Amish or a religion whose members have taken a vow of poverty (see IRS publication 517 and 4361). Federal workers employed before 1987 and various state and local workers, including those in some school districts who had their own retirement and disability programs, were given the one-time option of joining Social Security. Many employees and retirement and disability systems opted to keep out of the Social Security system because of the cost and the limited benefits. It was often less expensive to obtain higher retirement and disability benefits by staying in their original retirement and disability plans. Now, only a few of these plans allow new hires to join their existing plans without also joining Social Security. In 2004, the SSA estimated that 96% of all U.S. workers were covered by the system with the remaining 4% mostly a minority of government employees enrolled in public employee pensions and not subject to Social Security taxes due to historical exemptions.

It is possible for railroad employees to get "coordinated" retirement and disability benefits. The U.S. Railroad Retirement Board (or "RRB") is an independent agency in the executive branch of the United States government created in 1935 to administer a social insurance program providing retirement benefits to the country's railroad workers. Railroad retirement Tier I payroll taxes are coordinated with social security taxes so that employees and employers pay Tier I taxes at the same rate as social security taxes and have the same benefits. In addition, both workers and employers pay Tier II taxes (about 6.2% in 2005), which are used to finance railroad retirement and disability benefit payments that are over and above social security levels. Tier II benefits are a supplemental retirement and disability benefit system that pays 0.875% times years of service times average highest five years of employment salary, in addition to Social Security benefits.

FICA taxes are imposed on nearly all workers and self-employed persons. Employers are required to report wages for covered employment to the SSA for processing Forms W-2 and W-3. Some specific wages are not part of the Social Security program (discussed below). Internal Revenue Code provisions section 3101 imposes payroll taxes on individuals and employer matching taxes. Section 3102 mandates that employers deduct these payroll taxes from workers' wages before they are paid. Generally, the payroll tax is imposed on everyone in employment earning "wages" as defined in 3121 of the Internal Revenue Code. and also taxes net earnings from self-employment.

=== Trust fund ===
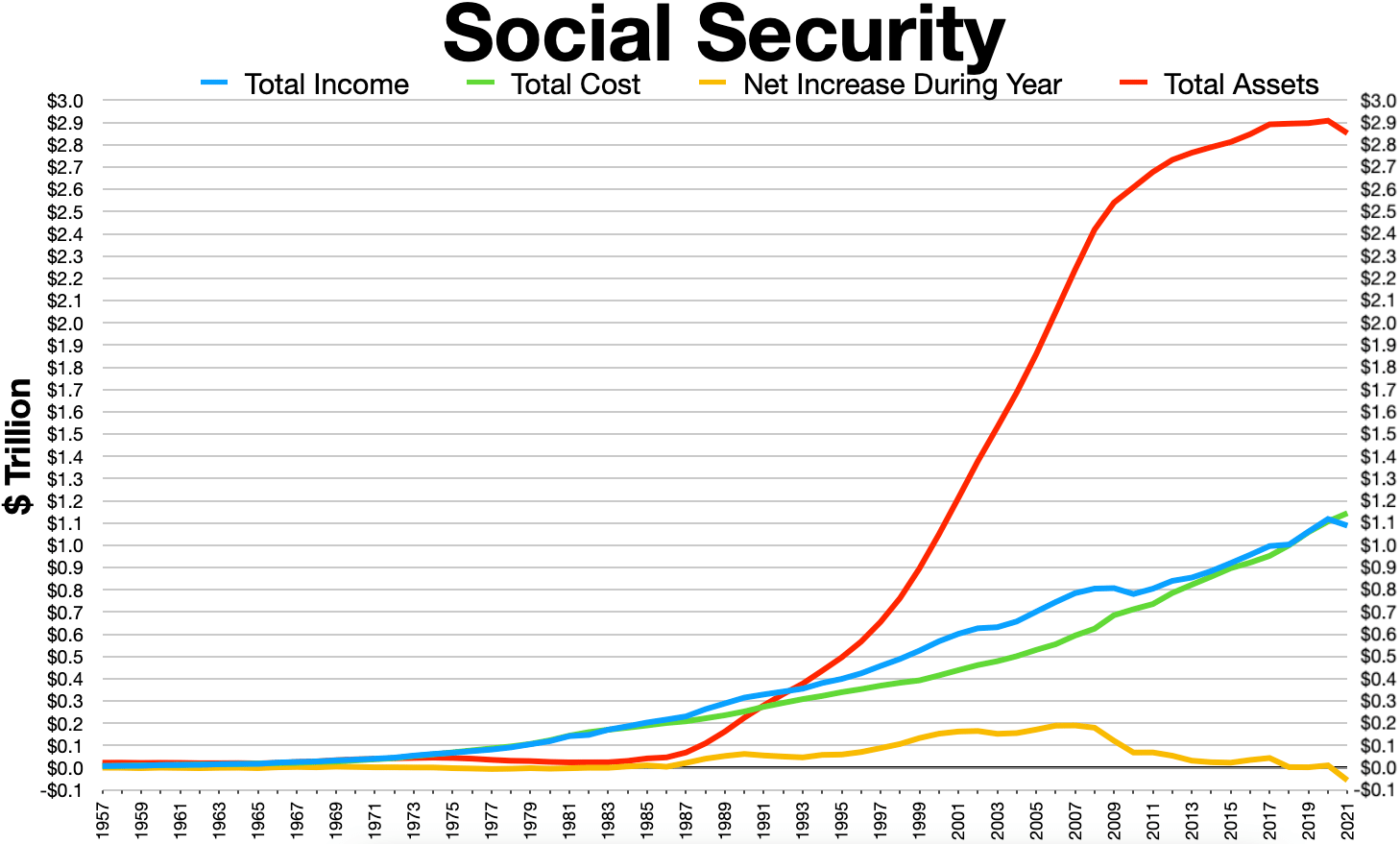
Social Security Trust Fund annual balances

Social Security taxes are paid into the Social Security Trust Fund maintained by the U.S. Treasury (technically, the "Federal Old-Age and Survivors Insurance Trust Fund", as established by 42 U.S.C. § 401(a)). Current year expenses are paid from current Social Security tax revenues. When revenues exceed expenditures, as they did between 1983 and 2009, the excess is invested in special series, non-marketable U.S. government bonds. Thus, the Social Security Trust Fund indirectly finances the federal government's general purpose deficit spending. In 2007, the cumulative excess of Social Security taxes and interest received over benefits paid stood at $2.2 trillion. Some regard the Trust Fund as an accounting construct with no economic significance. Others argue that it has specific legal significance because the Treasury securities it holds are backed by the "full faith and credit" of the U.S. government, which has an obligation to repay its debt.

The SSA authority to make benefit payments as granted by Congress extends only to its current revenues and existing Trust Fund balance, i.e. redemption of its holdings of Treasury securities. Therefore, Social Security's ability to make full payments once annual benefits exceed revenues depends in part on the federal government's ability to make good on the bonds it has issued to the Social Security trust funds. As with any other federal obligation, the federal government's ability to repay the Social Security Trust Fund is based on its power to tax and borrow and the commitment of the U.S. Congress to meet its obligations.

In 2009, the Office of the Chief Actuary of the SSA calculated an unfunded obligation of $15.1 trillion for the Social Security program. The unfunded obligation is the difference between the future cost of the Social Security program (based on several demographic assumptions such as mortality, work force participation, immigration, and age expectancy) and total assets in the Trust Fund given the expected contribution rate through the current scheduled payroll tax. This unfunded obligation is expressed in present value dollars and is a part of the Fund's long-range actuarial estimates, not necessarily a certainty of what will occur in the long run. An Actuarial Note to the calculation says "the term obligation is used in lieu of the term liability, because liability generally indicates a contractual obligation (as in the case of private pensions and insurance) that cannot be altered by the plan sponsor without the agreement of the plan participants."

=== Office of Hearings Operations (OHO, formerly ODAR or OHA) ===
On August 8, 2017, Acting Commissioner, Nancy A. Berryhill, informed employees that the Office of Disability Adjudication and Review ("ODAR") would be renamed to Office of Hearings Operations ("OHO"). The hearing offices had been known as "ODAR" since 2006, and the Office of Hearings and Appeals ("OHA") before that. OHO administers the ALJ hearings for the SSA. Administrative Law Judges (ALJs) conduct hearings and issue decisions. After an ALJ decision, the Appeals Council considers requests for review of ALJ decisions, and acts as the final level of administrative review for the SSA (the stage at which "exhaustion" could occur, a prerequisite for federal court review).

=== Benefit payout comparisons ===
Some federal, state, local and education government employees pay no Social Security tax but have their own retirement and disability systems that nearly always pay better retirement and disability benefits than the SSA. These plans typically require vesting (working 5–10 years for the same employer before becoming eligible for retirement). But their retirement typically depends on only the average of the best 3–10 years salaries times some retirement factor (typically 0.875%–3.0%) times years employed. This retirement benefit can be a "reasonably good" (75–85% of salary) retirement at close to the monthly salary at which they were last employed. For example, if a person joined the University of California retirement system at age 25 and worked for 35 years they could receive 87.5% (2.5% × 35) of their average highest three year salary with full medical coverage at age 60. Police and firefighters who joined at 25 and worked for 30 years could receive 90% (3.0% × 30) of their average salary and full medical coverage at age 55. These retirements have cost of living adjustments (COLA) applied each year but are limited to a maximum average income of $350,000/year or less. Spousal survivor benefits are available at 100–67% of the primary benefits rate for 8.7% to 6.7% reduction in retirement benefits, respectively. University of California Retirement Plan retirement and disability plan benefits are funded by contributions from both members and the university (typically 5% of salary each) and by the compounded investment earnings of the accumulated totals. These contributions and earnings are held in a trust fund that is invested. The retirement benefits are much more generous than Social Security but are believed to be actuarially sound. The main difference between state and local government sponsored retirement systems and Social Security is that the state and local retirement systems use compounded investments that are usually heavily weighted in stock market securities, which historically have returned more than 7.0%/year on average despite some years with losses. Short term federal government investments may be more secure but pay much lower average percentages. Nearly all other federal, state and local retirement systems work in a similar fashion with different benefit retirement ratios. Some plans are now combined with Social Security and are "piggy backed" on top of Social Security benefits. For example, the current Federal Employees Retirement System, which covers the vast majority of federal civil service employees hired after 1986, combines Social Security, a modest defined-benefit pension (1.1% per year of service) and the defined-contribution Thrift Savings Plan.

The current Social Security formula used in calculating the benefit level (primary insurance amount or PIA) is progressive vis-à-vis lower average salaries. Anyone who worked in OASDI covered employment and other retirement would be entitled to both the alternative non-OASDI pension and an Old Age retirement benefit from Social Security. Because of their limited time working in OASDI covered employment the sum of their covered salaries times inflation factor divided by 420 months yields a low adjusted indexed monthly salary over 35 years, AIME. The progressive nature of the PIA formula would in effect allow these workers to also get a slightly higher Social Security Benefit percentage on this low average salary. Congress passed in 1983 the Windfall Elimination Provision to minimize Social Security benefits for these recipients. The basic provision is that the first salary bracket, $0–791/month (2013) has its normal benefit percentage of 90% reduced to 40–90% – see Social Security for the exact percentage. The reduction is limited to roughly 50% of what a person would be eligible for if they had always worked under OASDI taxes. The 90% benefit percentage factor is not reduced if a person has 30 or more years of "substantial" earnings.

The average Social Security payment of $1,230/month ($14,760/year) in 2013 is only slightly above the federal poverty level for a one-person household – $11,420/yr and below the poverty guideline of $15,500/yr for two person households.

For this reason, financial advisers often encourage those who have the option to do so to supplement their Social Security contributions with private retirement plans such as an employer-sponsored 401(k) (or 403(b)) plan when they are offered by an employer. 58% of American workers have access to such plans. Many of these employers will match a portion of an employee's savings dollar-for-dollar up to a certain percentage of the employee's salary. Even without employer matches, individual retirement accounts (IRAs) are portable, self-directed, tax-deferred retirement accounts that offer the potential to substantially increase retirement savings compared to savings using no retirement plans. Their limitations include: the financial literacy to tell a "good" investment account from a less advantageous one; the savings barrier faced by those who are in low-wage employment or burdened by debt; the requirement of self-discipline to allot from an early age the required percentage of salary into "good" investment account(s); and the self–discipline needed to leave it there to earn compound interest until needed after retirement.

Financial advisers often suggest that long-term investment horizons should be used, as historically short-term investment losses "self correct", and most investments continue to deliver good average investment returns. The IRS has tax penalties for withdrawals from IRAs, 401(k)s, etc. before the age of 59 1/2, and requires mandatory withdrawals once the retiree reaches 73; other restrictions may also apply on the amount of tax-deferred income one can put in the account(s). For people who have access to them, self-directed retirement savings plans have the potential to match or even exceed the benefits earned by federal, state and local government retirement plans.

=== International agreements ===
People sometimes relocate from one country to another, either permanently or on a limited-time basis. This presents challenges to businesses, governments, and individuals seeking to ensure future benefits or having to deal with taxation authorities in multiple countries. To that end, the SSA has signed treaties, often referred to as Totalization Agreements, with other social insurance programs in various foreign countries.

Overall, these agreements serve two main purposes. First, they eliminate dual Social Security taxation, the situation that occurs when a worker from one country works in another country and is required to pay Social Security taxes to both countries on the same earnings. Second, the agreements help fill gaps in benefit protection for workers who have divided their careers between the United States and another country.

The following countries have signed totalization agreements with the SSA (and the date the agreement became effective):

- Italy (November 1, 1978)
- Germany (December 1, 1979)
- Switzerland (November 1, 1980)
- Belgium (July 1, 1984)
- Norway (July 1, 1984)
- Canada (August 1, 1984)
- United Kingdom (January 1, 1985)
- Sweden (January 1, 1987)
- Spain (April 1, 1988)
- France (July 1, 1988)
- Portugal (August 1, 1989)
- Netherlands (November 1, 1990)
- Austria (November 1, 1991)
- Finland (November 1, 1992)
- Ireland (September 1, 1993)
- Luxembourg (November 1, 1993)
- Greece (September 1, 1994)
- South Korea (April 1, 2001)
- Chile (December 1, 2001)
- Australia (October 1, 2002)
- Japan (October 1, 2005)
- Denmark (October 1, 2008)
- Czech Republic (January 1, 2009)
- Poland (March 1, 2009)
- Slovak Republic (May 1, 2014)
- Mexico (Signed on June 29, 2004, but not yet in effect)

=== Social Security number ===
A side effect of the Social Security program in the United States has been the near-universal adoption of the program's identification number, the Social Security number (SSN), as the de facto U.S. national identification number. The SSN is issued pursuant to section 205(c)(2) of the Social Security Act, codified as 42 U.S.C. § 405(c)(2). The government originally stated that the SSN would not be a means of identification, but currently a multitude of U.S. entities use the SSN as a personal identifier. These include government agencies such as the Internal Revenue Service as well as the military, in addition to private agencies such as banks, colleges and universities, health insurance companies, and employers.

Although the Social Security Act itself does not require a person to have an SSN to live and work in the United States, the U.S. Internal Revenue Code does generally require the use of the SSN by individuals for federal tax purposes:

The social security account number issued to an individual for purposes of section 205(c)(2)(A) of the Social Security Act shall, except as shall otherwise be specified under regulations of the Secretary [of the Treasury or his delegate], be used as the identifying number for such individual for purposes of this title.

Importantly, most parents apply for SSNs for their dependent children in order to include them on their income tax returns as a dependent. Everyone filing a tax return, as taxpayer or spouse, must have an SSN or Taxpayer Identification Number (TIN) since the IRS is unable to process returns or post payments for anyone without an SSN or TIN.

The Privacy Act of 1974 was in part intended to limit usage of the SSN as a means of identification. Paragraph (1) of subsection (a) of section 7 of the Privacy Act, an uncodified provision, states in part:

(1) It shall be unlawful for any Federal, State or local government agency to deny to any individual any right, benefit, or privilege provided by law because of such individual's refusal to disclose his social security account number.

However, the Social Security Act provides:

It is the policy of the United States that any State (or political subdivision thereof) may, in the administration of any tax, general public assistance, driver's license, or motor vehicle registration law within its jurisdiction, utilize the social security account numbers issued by the Commissioner of Social Security for the purpose of establishing the identification of individuals affected by such law, and may require any individual who is or appears to be so affected to furnish to such State (or political subdivision thereof) or any agency thereof having administrative responsibility for the law involved, the social security account number (or numbers, if he has more than one such number) issued to him by the Commissioner of Social Security.

Further, paragraph (2) of subsection (a) of section 7 of the Privacy Act provides in part:

(2) the provisions of paragraph (1) of this subsection shall not apply with respect to –

(A) any disclosure which is required by Federal statute, or

(B) the disclosure of a social security number to any Federal, State, or local agency maintaining a system of records in existence and operating before January 1, 1975, if such disclosure was required under statute or regulation adopted prior to such date to verify the identity of an individual.

The exceptions under section 7 of the Privacy Act include the Internal Revenue Code requirement that SSNs be used as taxpayer identification numbers for individuals.

=== Demographic and revenue projections ===
In each year since 1982, OASDI tax receipts, interest payments and other income had exceeded benefit payments and other expenditures, for example by more than $150 billion in 2004. However, as the "baby boomers" moved out of the work force and into retirement, expenses came to exceed tax receipts and then, exceeded all OASDI trust income, including interest, starting in 2018 (see chart Social Security Revenue and Cost, above). At that point the system began drawing on its trust fund Treasury Notes, and will continue to pay benefits at the then current levels until the Trust Fund is exhausted.

When the costs of the Social Security program started to exceed income in 2018, the trust fund began to empty and, without changes made to the system, will be fully depleted in the future. In a survey of 210 members of the American Economics Association published in November 2006, 85 percent agreed with the statement: "The gap between Social Security funds and expenditures will become unsustainably large within the next fifty years if current policies remain unchanged."

Furthermore, increased spending for the Social Security program will occur at the same time as increases in demand for Medicare, as a result of the aging of the baby boomers. One projection illustrates the relationship between the two programs:

From 2004 to 2030, the combined spending on Social Security and Medicare is expected to rise from 8% of national income (gross domestic product) to 13%. Two-thirds of the increase occurs in Medicare.

In May 2024, the Treasury Department issued the annual trustees report for the Old-Age and Survivors Insurance and Disability Insurance Trust Funds with depletion date projections for the funds estimated at 2033 and 2098 respectively and by 2035 when combined.

According to the 2026 Trustees Report, the Old-Age and Survivors Insurance Trust Fund is projected to be depleted in the fourth quarter of 2032. At that point, continuing revenue would be sufficient to pay 78% of scheduled OASI benefits in the absence of legislative changes.

==== Ways to eliminate the projected shortfall ====
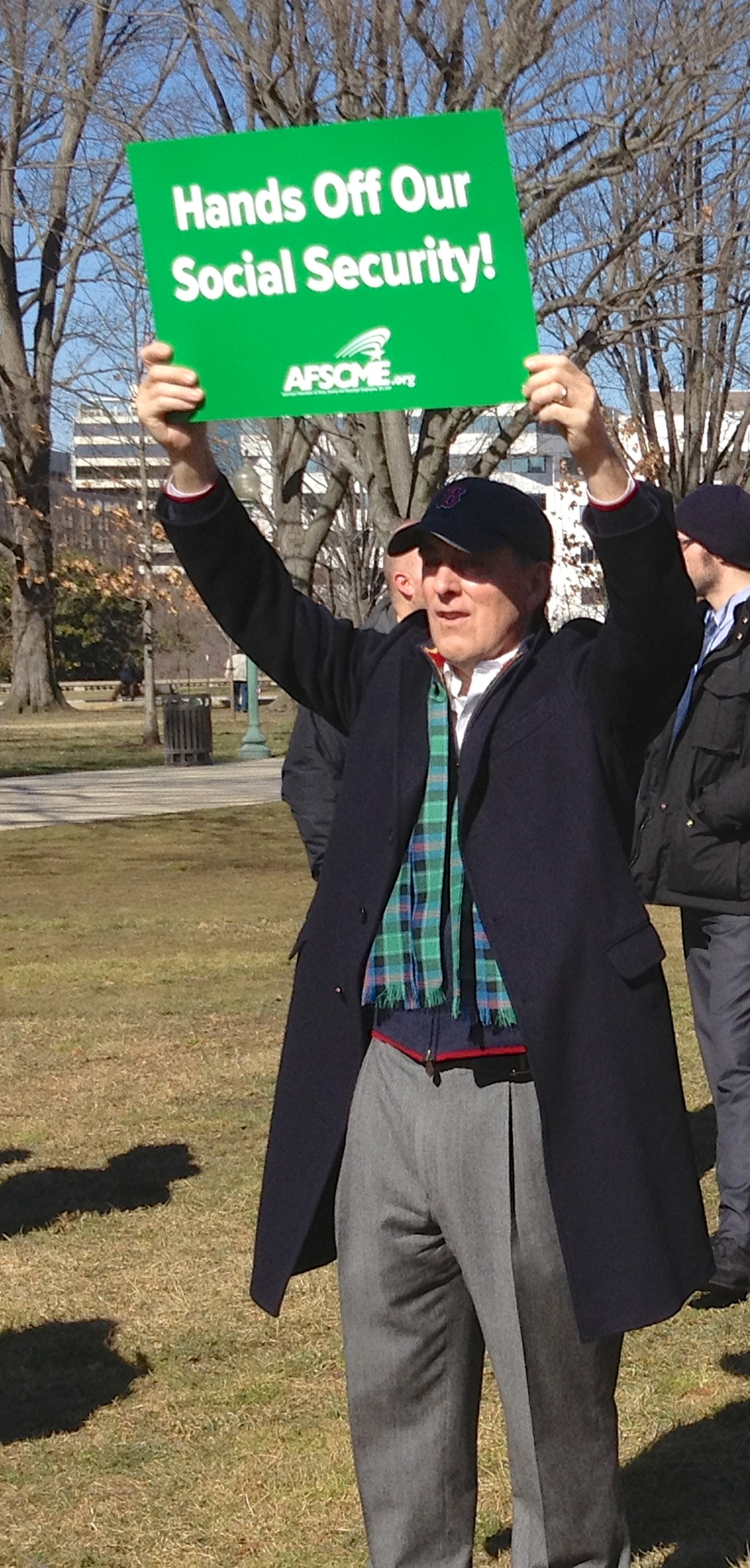
A February 2013 protest

The Social Security program is predicted to run out of money to pay all prospective benefits at today's level of benefits in 2034. Ways to extend that date are as follows.

- Lift the payroll ceiling. The payroll ceiling is now adjusted for inflation and is $184,500 in 2026. Robert Reich, former United States Secretary of Labor, suggests lifting the ceiling on income subject to Social Security taxes. An increase of the cap to $330,500 would reduce the annual social security deficit by 26% and removing the cap would reduce the deficit by 68%.
- A 2025 poll found that 65% of Democrats and 62% of Republicans supported increasing or eliminating the income limit on earnings taxed for Social Security.
- Increase Social Security taxes. Today, workers and employers each contribute 6.2% of earnings to Social Security (self-employeds pay 12.4%). An increase in the social security tax from 6.2% to 7.2% would decrease the annual deficit by 25% according to an estimate made in 2026.
- Raise the retirement age(s). Raising the normal retirement age by two months per year until it reaches 69 in 2034 would reduce payouts and improve solvency. Simply raising the full retirement age from 67 to 68 would reduce the annual deficit by 12%.
- Means-test benefits. A phase out of Social Security benefits for those who already have income over $48,000/year ($4,000/month) would eliminate over 20% of the funding gap. This is not very popular, with only 31% of surveyed households favoring it.
- Change the cost-of-living adjustment (COLA). Several proposals have been discussed. Effects of COLA reductions would be cumulative over time and would affect some groups more than others. Poverty rates would increase.
- Extend the payroll tax to employer paid health insurance benefits. Health benefits paid by employers on behalf of employees are not included, as of 2026, as a taxable benefit and thus are not contributing to Social Security. Taxing those benefits would reduce the annual deficit by 23%
- Cap Social Security benefits. Capping benefits to $100,000 per year for couples and $50,000 per year for single persons would reduce the funding gap by 20%.
- Reduce benefits for new retirees. If Social Security benefits were reduced by 3% to 5% for new retirees, about 18% to 30% percent of the funding gap would be eliminated.
- Average in more working years. Social Security benefits are now based on an average of a worker's 35 highest paid annual salaries with zeros averaged in if there are fewer than 35 years of covered wages. The averaging period could be increased to 38 or 40 years, which could potentially reduce the deficit by 10% to 20%, respectively.
- Require all newly hired people to join Social Security. Over 90% of all workers already pay FICA and SECA taxes, so there is not much to gain by this. There would be an early increase in Social Security income that would be partially offset later by the benefits they might collect when they retire.

== Taxation ==
=== Tax on wages and self-employment income ===
Benefits are funded by taxes imposed on wages of employees and self-employed persons. As explained below, in the case of employment, the employer and employee are each responsible for one half of the Social Security tax associated with the employee, with the employee's half being withheld from the employee's pay check. In the case of self-employed persons (i.e., independent contractors), the self-employed person is responsible for the entire amount of Social Security tax associated with the self-employed person.

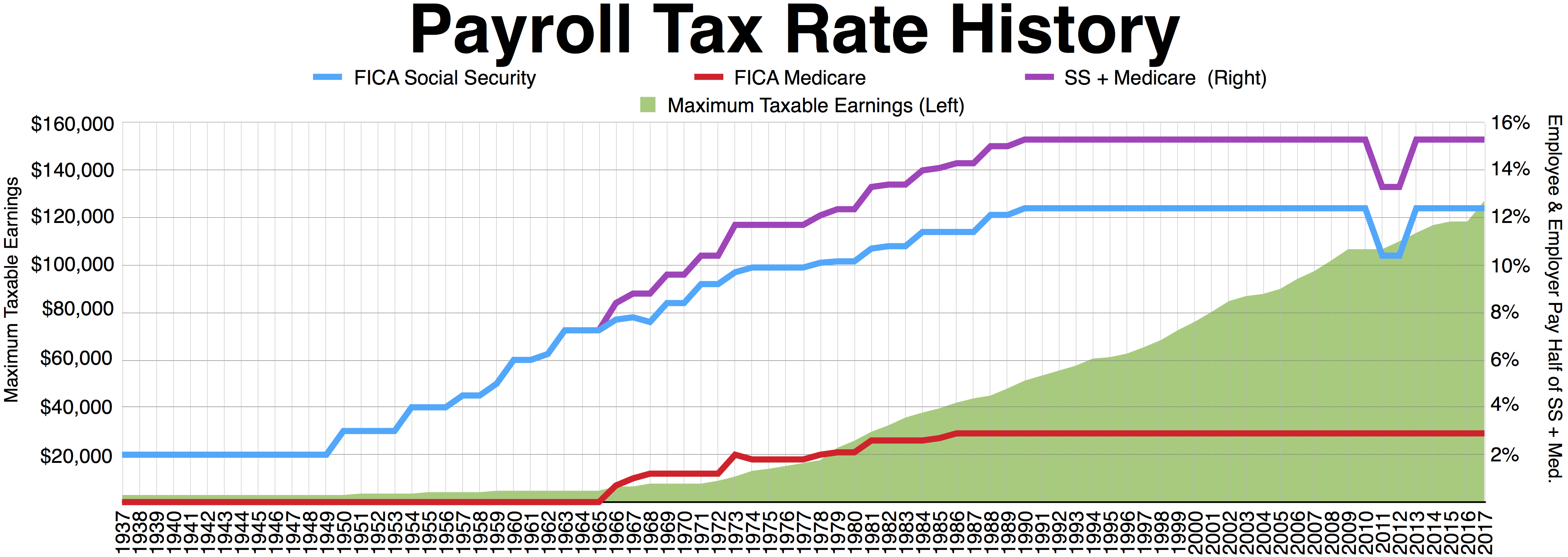
Payroll tax rates history

The portion of taxes collected from the employee for Social Security are referred to as "trust fund taxes" and the employer is required to remit them to the government. These taxes take priority over everything, and represent the only debts of a corporation or LLC that can impose personal liability upon its officers or managers. A sole proprietor and officers of a corporation and managers of an LLC can be held personally liable for non-payment of the income tax and social security taxes whether or not actually collected from the employee.

The Federal Insurance Contributions Act (FICA) (codified in the Internal Revenue Code) imposes a Social Security withholding tax equal to 6.20% of the gross wage amount, up to but not exceeding the Social Security Wage Base ($97,500 for 2007; $102,000 for 2008; and $106,800 for 2009, 2010, and 2011). The same 6.20% tax is imposed on employers. For 2011 and 2012, the employee's contribution was temporarily reduced to 4.2%, while the employer's portion remained at 6.2%. In 2024, the Social Security Wage Base (the upper limit on earnings taxed) increased to $168,600. For each calendar year for which the worker is assessed the FICA contribution, the SSA credits those wages as that year's covered wages. The income cutoff is adjusted yearly for inflation and other factors.

A separate payroll tax of 1.45% of an employee's income is paid directly by the employer, and an additional 1.45% deducted from the employee's paycheck, yielding a total tax rate of 2.90%. There is no maximum limit on this portion of the tax. This portion of the tax is used to fund the Medicare program, which is primarily responsible for providing health benefits to retirees and also pay benefits to those on disability.

The changes in Social Security tax rates over time can be accessed on the SSA website.

The combined tax rate of these two federal programs is 15.30% (7.65% paid by the employee and 7.65% paid by the employer). In 2011–2012 it temporarily dropped to 13.30% (5.65% paid by the employee and 7.65% paid by the employer).

For self-employed workers (who technically are not employees and are deemed not to be earning "wages" for federal tax purposes), the self-employment tax, imposed by the Self-Employment Contributions Act of 1954, codified as Chapter 2 of Subtitle A of the Internal Revenue Code, 26 U.S.C. §§ 1401–1403, is 15.3% of "net earnings from self-employment". In essence, a self-employed individual pays both the employee and employer share of the tax, although half of the self-employment tax (the "employer share") is deductible when calculating the individual's federal income tax.

If an employee has overpaid payroll taxes by having more than one job or switching jobs during the year, the excess taxes will be refunded when the employee files an annual federal income tax return. Any excess taxes paid by employers, however, are not refundable to the employers.

By Congressional Budget Office (CBO) calculations, the lowest income quintile (0–20%) and second quintile (21–40%) of households in the U.S. pay an average income tax of −9.3% and −2.6% and Social Security taxes of 8.3% and 7.9% respectively. By CBO calculations the household incomes in the first quintile and second quintile have an average Total Federal Tax rate of 1.0% and 3.8% respectively.

==== Wages not subject to tax ====
Workers are not required to pay Social Security taxes on wages from certain types of work:

- A student working part-time for a university, enrolled at least half-time at the same university, and their relationship with the university is primarily an educational one.
- A student who is a household employee for a college club, fraternity, or sorority, and is enrolled and regularly attending classes at a university.
- A child under age 18 (or under age 21 for domestic service) who is employed by their parent.
- A person who receives payments from a state or a local government for services performed to be relieved from unemployment.
- An incarcerated person who works for the state or local government that operates the prison in which the person is incarcerated.
- A person at an institution who works for the state or local government that operates the institution.
- An employee of a state or local government who was hired on a temporary basis in response to a specific unforeseen fire, storm, snow, earthquake, flood, or a similar emergency, and the employee is not intended to become a permanent employee.
- A newspaper carrier under age 18.
- A real estate agent or salespeople's compensation if substantially all the compensation is directly related to sales or other output, rather than to the number of hours worked, and there is a written contract stating that the individual will not be treated as an employee for federal tax purposes.
- Employees of state or local government entities in Alaska, California, Colorado, Illinois, Louisiana, Maine, Massachusetts, Nevada, Ohio, and Texas.
- Earnings as a council member of a federally recognized Indian tribe.
- A fishing worker who is a member of a federally recognized Indian tribe that has recognized fishing rights.
- A nonresident alien who is an employee of a foreign government on wages paid in their official capacities as a foreign government employee.
- A nonresident alien who is employed by a foreign employer as a crew member working on a foreign ship or foreign aircraft.
- A nonresident alien who is a student, scholar, professor, teacher, trainee, researcher, physician, au pair, or summer camp worker and is temporarily in the United States in F-1, J-1, M-1, Q-1, or Q-2 nonimmigrant status for wages paid to them for services that are allowed by their visa status and are performed to carry out the purposes the visa states.
- A nonresident alien who is an employee of an international organization on wages paid by the international organization.
- A nonresident alien who is on an H-2A visa.
- A nonresident alien who works in Guam, is a resident of the Philippines, and is on an H-2A, H-2B, or H-2R visa.
- A member of certain religious groups, such as the Mennonites and the Amish, who consider insurance to be a lack of trust in God, and see it as their religious duty to provide for members who are sick, disabled, or elderly.
- A person who is temporarily working outside their country of origin and is covered under a tax treaty between their country and the United States.
- Net annual earnings from self-employment of less than $400.
- Wages received for service as an election worker, if less than $1,400 a year (in 2008).
- Wages received for working as a household employee, if less than $1,700 per year (in 2009–2010).

=== Federal income taxation of benefits ===
Originally the benefits received by retirees were not taxed as income. Beginning in tax year 1984, with the Reagan-era reforms to repair the system's projected insolvency, retirees with incomes over $25,000 (in the case of married persons filing separately who did not live with the spouse at any time during the year, and for persons filing as "single"), or with combined incomes over $32,000 (if married filing jointly) or, in certain cases, any income amount (if married filing separately from the spouse in a year in which the taxpayer lived with the spouse at any time) generally saw part of the retiree benefits subject to federal income tax. In 1984, the portion of the benefits potentially subject to tax was 50%. The Deficit Reduction Act of 1993 set the portion to 85%. Moreover, since the taxable income threshold is not indexed to inflation, the portion of beneficiaries' social security payments subject to income tax has risen significantly in real terms since the threshold was set in 1984.

== Criticism ==
=== Discrimination against the poor and the middle class ===
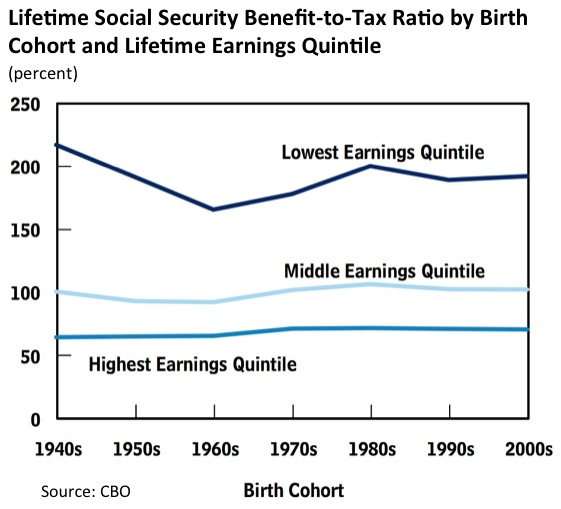
For people in the bottom fifth of the earnings distribution, the ratio of benefits to taxes is almost three times as high as it is for those in the top fifth.

Workers must pay 12.4 percent, including a 6.2 percent employer contribution, on their wages below the Social Security Wage Base ($168,600 in 2024), but no tax on income in excess of this amount. Therefore, high earners pay a lower percentage of their total income because of the income caps; because of this, and the fact there is no tax on unearned income, social security taxes are often viewed as being regressive. However, benefits are adjusted to be significantly more progressive, even when accounting for differences in life expectancy. According to the non-partisan Congressional Budget Office, for people in the bottom fifth of the earnings distribution, the ratio of benefits to taxes is almost three times as high as it is for those in the top fifth.

Despite its regressive tax rate, Social Security benefits are calculated using a progressive benefit formula that replaces a much higher percentage of low-income workers' pre-retirement income than that of higher-income workers (although these low-income workers pay a higher percentage of their pre-retirement income). Supporters of the current system also point to numerous studies that show that, relative to high-income workers, Social Security disability and survivor benefits paid on behalf of low-income workers more than offset any retirement benefits that may be lost because of shorter life expectancy (this offset would apply only at a population level). Other research asserts that survivor benefits, allegedly an offset, actually exacerbate the problem because survivor benefits are denied to single individuals, including widow(er)s married fewer than nine months (except in certain situations), divorced widow(er)s married fewer than ten years, and co-habiting or same-sex couples, unless they are legally married in their state of residence. Unmarried individuals and minorities tend to be less wealthy.

Social Security's benefit formula provides 90% of average indexed monthly earnings (AIME) below the first "bend point" of $791/month, 32% of AIME between the first and second bend points $791 to $4781/month, and 15% of AIME in excess of the second bend point up to the Ceiling cap of $113,700 in 2013. The low income bias of the benefit calculation means that a lower paid worker receives a much higher percentage of their salary in benefit payments than higher paid workers. A married low salaried worker can receive over 100% of their salary in benefits after retiring at the full retirement age. High-salaried workers receive 43% or less of their salary in benefits despite having paid into the "system" at the same rate (see benefit calculations above). To minimize the impact of Social Security taxes on low salaried workers the Earned Income Tax Credit and the Child Care Tax Credit were passed by the U.S. Congress, which largely refund the FICA and or SECA payments of low-salaried workers through the income tax system. By Congressional Budget Office (CBO) calculations, the lowest income quintile (0–20%) and second quintile (21–40%) of households in the U.S., pay an average federal income tax of −9.3% and −2.6% of income and Social Security taxes of 8.3% and 7.9% of income respectively. By CBO calculations, the household incomes in the first and second quintiles have an average total federal tax rate of 1.0% and 3.8% respectively. However, these groups also have the smallest percentage of American household incomes – the first quintile earns 3.2% of all income, while the second quintile earns 8.4% of all income. Higher-income retirees pay income taxes on 85% of their Social Security benefits and 100% on all other retirement benefits they may have.

=== Marital status ===
The Social Security Act defines the rules for determining marital relationships for SSI recipients. The act requires that if a couple is cohabitating, they should be considered married for purposes of the SSI program. Consequently, if the claimant is found disabled and found to be "holding out"; this claimant will be entitled to reduced or no SSI benefits. However, the Social Security Act does not accept that a claimant "holding out as husband or wife" should be entitled of Survivor, Retirement or Widow(er)s benefits, when the claimant's "husband or wife" dies. SSA rules and regulations about marital status either prohibit (SRDI program) or reduce (SSI program) benefits to indigent claimants.

=== Politicians exempted themselves from the tax ===
Critics of Social Security have said that the politicians who created Social Security exempted themselves from having to pay the Social Security tax. When the federal government created Social Security, all federal employees, including the president and members of Congress, were exempt from having to pay the Social Security tax, and they received no Social Security benefits. This law was changed by the Social Security Amendments of 1983, which brought within the Social Security system all members of Congress, the president and the vice president, federal judges, and certain executive-level political appointees, as well as all federal employees hired in any capacity on or after January 1, 1984. Many state and local government workers, however, are exempt from Social Security taxes because they contribute instead to alternative retirement systems set up by their employers.

=== Comparison to a Ponzi scheme ===
Critics as early as 2002 have drawn parallels between Social Security and Ponzi schemes, arguing that the sustenance of Social Security is due to continuous contributions over time. One difference between a traditional Ponzi scheme and Social Security, is that while both may have similar structures—in particular, a sustainability problem when the number of new people paying in is declining—they have differing degrees of transparency. In the case of a traditional Ponzi scheme, the fact that there is no return-generating mechanism other than contributions from new entrants is obscured, whereas the Social Security scheme is designed to have payouts openly underwritten by incoming tax revenue and the interest on the Treasury bonds held by or for the Social Security scheme. Private sector Ponzi schemes are also vulnerable to collapse because they cannot force new entrants to contribute, whereas participation in the Social Security program is usually mandatory upon beginning one's first job in the United States. In connection with these and other issues, Robert E. Wright called Social Security a quasi-pyramid scheme—rather than a true Ponzi scheme—in his book, Fubarnomics.

In March 2025, Elon Musk called Social Security a Ponzi scheme. E.J. Antoni, President Trump's August 2025 nominee for the Bureau of Labor Statistics has repeatedly referred to Social Security as a "Ponzi scheme"; Antoni has advocated for sunsetting the program, saying "you'll need a generation of people who pay Social Security taxes but never actually receive any of those benefits". He clarified the point by further stating that "The people who are going to retire 10, 20, even 30, or certainly 40 years from now—I'm sorry, but the program is not going to be viable at that time".

As demographic shifts, the system becomes harder to sustain without increasing taxes or reducing benefits, or both; similar to the nature of a Pyramid scheme or Ponzi scheme..

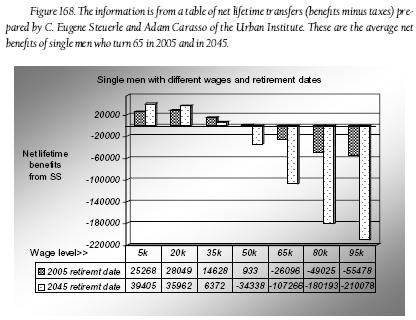
Single men with different wages and retirement dates

=== Estimated net benefits under differing circumstances ===
In 2004, Urban Institute economists C. Eugene Steuerle and Adam Carasso created a Web-based Social Security benefits calculator. Using this calculator, it is possible to estimate net Social Security benefits (i.e., estimated lifetime benefits minus estimated lifetime FICA taxes paid) for different types of recipients. In the book Democrats and Republicans – Rhetoric and Reality, Joseph Fried used the calculator to create graphical depictions of the estimated net benefits of men and women who were at different wage levels, single and married (with stay-at-home spouses), and retiring in different years. These graphs vividly show that generalizations about Social Security benefits may be of little predictive value for any given worker, due to the wide disparity of net benefits for people at different income levels and in different demographic groups. For example, the graph below (Figure 168) shows the impact of wage level and retirement date on a male worker. As income goes up, net benefits get smaller – even negative.

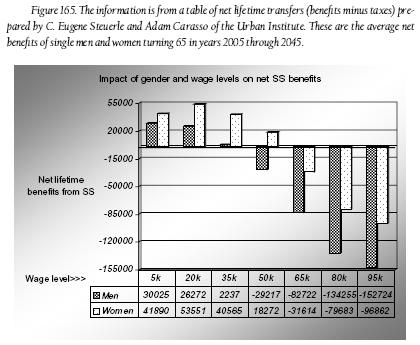
Impact of gender and wage levels on net Social Security benefits

However, the impact is much greater for the future retiree (in 2045) than for the current retiree (2005). The male earning $95,000 per year and retiring in 2045 is estimated to lose over $200,000 by participating in the Social Security system.

In the next graph (Figure 165), the depicted net benefits are averaged for people turning age 65 anytime during the years 2005 through 2045. (In other words, the disparities shown are not related to retirement.) However, there is an impact of gender and wage level. Because women tend to live longer, they generally collect Social Security benefits for a longer time. As a result, they get a higher net benefit, on average, no matter what the wage level.

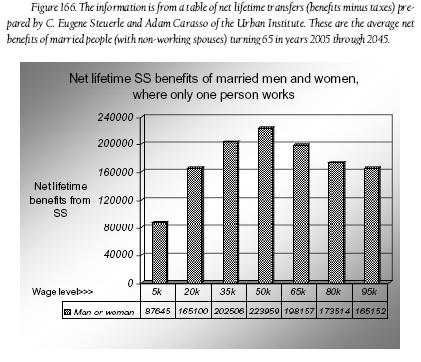
Net lifetime SS benefits of married men and women where only one person works

The next graph (Figure 166), shows estimated net benefits for married men and women at different wage levels. In this scenario, it is assumed that the spouse has little or no earnings and, thus, will be entitled to collect a spousal retirement benefit. According to Fried:

Two significant factors are evident: First, every column in Figure 166 depicts a net benefit that is higher than any column in Figure 165. In other words, the average married person (with a stay-at-home spouse) gets a greater benefit per FICA tax dollar paid than does the average single person, no matter what the gender or wage level. Second, there is only limited progressivity among married workers with stay-at-home spouses. Review Figure 166 carefully: The net benefits drop as the wage levels increase from $50,000 to $95,000; however, they increase as the wage levels grow from $5,000 to $50,000. In fact, net benefits are lowest for those earning just $5,000 per year.

The last graph shown (Figure 167), is a combination of Figures 165 and 166. In this graph it is clear why generalizations about the value of Social Security benefits are meaningless. At the $95,000 wage level, a married person could be a big winner, getting net benefits of about $165,000. On the other hand, he could lose an estimated $152,000 in net benefits if he remains single. Altogether, there is a "swing" of over $300,000 based upon the marriage decision (and the division of earnings between the spouses). In addition, there is a large disparity between the high net benefits of the married person earning $95,000 ($165,152) versus the relatively low net benefits of the man or woman earning $5,000 ($30,025 or $41,890, depending on gender). In other words, the high earner, in this scenario, gets a far greater return on his FICA tax investment than does the low earner.

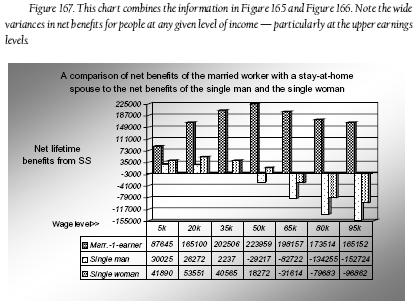
Comparison of net SS benefits

In the book How Social Security Picks Your Pocket other factors affecting Social Security net benefits are identified: Generally, people who work for more than 35 years get a lower net benefit, all other factors being equal. People who do not live long after retirement age get a much lower net benefit. Finally, people who derive a high percentage of income from non-wage sources get high Social Security net benefits because they appear to be poor, when they are not. The progressive benefit formula for Social Security is blind to the income a worker may have from non-wage sources, such as spousal support, dividends and interest, or rental income.

== Current controversies ==
=== Contrast with private pensions ===
Although Social Security is sometimes compared to private pensions, the two systems are different in a number of respects. It has been argued that Social Security is an insurance plan as opposed to a retirement plan. Unlike a pension, for example, Social Security pays disability benefits. A private pension fund accumulates the money paid into it, eventually using those reserves to pay pensions to the workers who contributed to the fund; and a private system is not universal.

Social Security cannot "prefund" by investing in marketable assets such as equities, because federal law prohibits it from investing in assets other than those backed by the U.S. government. As a result, its investments to date have been limited to special non-negotiable securities issued by the U.S. Treasury, although some argue that debt issued by the Federal National Mortgage Association and other quasi-governmental organizations could meet legal standards. Social Security cannot by law invest in private equities, although some other countries (such as Canada) and some states permit their pension funds to invest in private equities. As a universal system, Social Security generally operates as a pipeline, through which current tax receipts from workers are used to pay current benefits to retirees, survivors, and the disabled. When there is an excess of taxes withheld over benefits paid, by law this excess is invested in Treasury securities (not in private equities) as described above.

Two broad categories of private pension plans are "defined benefit pension plans" and "defined contribution pension plans". Of these two, Social Security is more similar to a defined benefit pension plan. In a defined benefit pension plan, the benefits ultimately received are based on some sort of pre-determined formula (such as one based on years worked and highest salary earned). Defined benefit pension plans generally do not include separate accounts for each participant. By contrast, in a defined contribution pension plan each participant has a specific account with funds put into that account (by the employer or the participant, or both), and the ultimate benefit is based on the amount in that account at the time of retirement. Some have proposed that the Social Security system be modified to provide for the option of individual accounts (in effect, to make the system, at least in part, more like a defined contribution pension plan). Specifically, on February 2, 2005, President George W. Bush made Social Security a prominent theme of his State of the Union Address. He described the Social Security system as "headed for bankruptcy", and outlined, in general terms, a proposal based on partial privatization. Critics responded that privatization would require huge new government borrowing to fund benefit payments during the transition years. See Social Security debate (United States).

Both "defined benefit" and "defined contribution" private pension plans are governed by the Employee Retirement Income Security Act (ERISA), which requires employers to provide minimum levels of funding to support "defined benefits" pensions. The purpose is to protect the workers from corporate mismanagement and outright bankruptcy of the plan, although in practice many private pension funds have fallen short in recent years. In terms of financial structure, the current Social Security system is analogous to an underfunded "defined benefit" pension ("underfunded" meaning not that it is in trouble, but that its savings are not enough to pay future benefits without collecting future tax revenues).

=== Contrast with insurance ===
Besides the argument over whether the returns on Social Security contributions should or can be compared to returns on private investment instruments, there is the question of whether the contributions are nonetheless analogous to pooled insurance premiums charged by for-profit commercial insurance companies to maintain and generate a return on a "risk pool of funds". Like any insurance program, Social Security "spreads risk" as the program protects workers and covered family members against loss of income from the wage earner's retirement, disability, or death. For example, a worker who becomes disabled at a young age could receive a large return relative to the amount they contributed in FICA before becoming disabled, since disability benefits can continue for life. As in private insurance plans, everyone in the particular insurance pool is insured against the same risks, but not everyone will benefit to the same extent.

The analogy to insurance, however, is limited by the fact that paying FICA taxes creates no legal right to benefits and by the extent to which Social Security is funded by FICA taxes. During 2011 and 2012, for example, FICA tax revenue was insufficient to maintain Social Security's solvency without transfers from general revenues. These transfers added to the general budget deficit like general program spending.

=== Private retirement savings crisis ===
While inflation-adjusted stock market values generally rose from 1978 to 1997, from 1998 through 2007 they were higher than in March 2013. This has caused workers' supplemental retirement plans such as 401(k)s to perform substantially more poorly than expected when current retirees were investing the bulk of their savings in them. In 2010, the median household retirement account balance for workers aged 55 to 64 was $120,000, which will provide only a trivial supplement to Social Security benefits, but about a third of households had no retirement savings. 75% of Americans nearing retirement age had less than $30,000 in their retirement accounts, which Forbes called "the greatest retirement crisis in American history".

=== Court interpretation of the Act to provide benefits ===
The United States Court of Appeals for the Seventh Circuit has indicated that the Social Security Act has a moral purpose and should be liberally interpreted in favor of claimants when deciding what counted as covered wages for purposes of meeting the quarters of coverage requirement to make a worker eligible for benefits. That court has also stated: "... [T]he regulations should be liberally applied in favor of beneficiaries" when deciding a case in favor of a felon who had his disability payments retroactively terminated upon incarceration. According to the court, that the Social Security Act "should be liberally construed in favor of those seeking its benefits can not be doubted". "The hope behind this statute is to save men and women from the rigors of the poor house as well as from the haunting fear that such a lot awaits them when journey's end is near."

=== Constitutionality ===
The constitutionality of Social Security is intricately linked to the evolving nature of U.S. Supreme Court jurisprudence on federal power (the 20th century saw a dramatic increase in allowed congressional action). When Social Security was first passed, there were significant questions over its constitutionality as the Court had found another pension scheme, the original Railroad Retirement Act, to violate the due process clause of the Fifth Amendment. Some, such as University of Chicago law professor Richard Epstein and Harvard University professor Robert Nozick, have argued that Social Security should be unconstitutional.

In the 1937, U.S. Supreme Court case of Helvering v. Davis, the Court examined the constitutionality of Social Security when George Davis of the Edison Electric Illuminating Company of Boston sued in connection with the Social Security tax. The U.S. District Court for the District of Massachusetts first upheld the tax. The District Court judgment was reversed by the Circuit Court of Appeals. Commissioner Guy Helvering of the Bureau of Internal Revenue (now the Internal Revenue Service) took the case to the U.S. Supreme Court, and the Court upheld the validity of the tax.

During the 1930s, President Franklin Delano Roosevelt was in the midst of promoting the passage of a large number of social welfare programs under the New Deal and the U.S. Supreme Court struck down many of those programs (such as the Railroad Retirement Act and the National Recovery Act) as unconstitutional. Modified versions of the affected programs were afterwards approved by the Court, including Social Security.

When Helvering v. Davis was argued before the Court, the larger issue of constitutionality of the old-age insurance portion of Social Security was not decided. The case was limited to whether the payroll tax was a suitable use of Congress's taxing power. Despite this, no serious challenges regarding the system's constitutionality are now being litigated, and Congress's spending power may be more coextensive, as shown in cases like South Dakota v. Dole during the Reagan Administration.

=== Social Security number holders with no death date ===
In 2025, President Donald Trump asserted that the Social Security Administration (SSA) was providing benefits to millions of people between the ages of 110 and 360 years. The SSA does have people in their system who are older than 100 and do not have a recorded death date. An audit report produced by the Office of the Inspector General (OIG) in 2023 addresses this issue and states, "at the time of our review, although the Census Bureau estimated approximately 86,000 individuals residing in the United States were age 100 or older, SSA's Numident included approximately 18.9 million numberholders who were born in 1920 or earlier but had no death information on their Numident record". The OIG recommended that the SSA input correct death dates to "enhance Government-wide improper payment prevention and detection". The audit report includes the SSA's response to the findings of the OIG and states that the SSA was aware of the missing death dates, but that "the records identified by OIG involve non-beneficiaries and do not involve improper payments. Correcting records for nonbeneficiaries would divert resources from work necessary to administer and manage our programs, which we cannot afford". The SSA's estimated cost to correct the issue was between $5.5 and $9.7 million. The potential for fraudulent use of these records was in part nullified in September 2015 when the Social Security Administration implemented an automated system where entitlement to benefits is automatically terminated if individuals are listed as 115 years or older. Therefore, while the SSA does have millions of people over 115 who do not have death dates in the SSA system, their eligibility for benefits have been automatically terminated and they cannot receive social security payments.

== Fraud and abuse ==
A 2024 report by the Inspector General of the Social Security Administration found that less than one percent of total social security benefits dispersed over the period 2015–2022 were improper payments.

=== Social Security Number theft ===
Because Social Security Numbers (SSNs) have become useful in identity theft and other forms of crime, various schemes have been perpetrated to acquire valid SSNs and related identity information.

In February 2006, the Social Security Administration (SSA) received several reports of an email message being circulated addressed to "Dear Social Security Number And Card owner" and purporting to be from the SSA. The message informs the reader "that someone illegally is using your Social Security number and assuming your identity" and directs the reader to a website designed to look like the SSA Internet website.

"I am outraged that someone would target an unsuspecting public in this manner," said Commissioner Jo Anne B. Barnhart. "I have asked the Inspector General to use all the resources at his command to find and prosecute whoever is perpetrating this fraud."

Once directed to the phony website, the individual is reportedly asked to confirm their identity with "Social Security and bank information". Specific information about the individual's credit card number, expiration date and PIN is then requested. "Whether on our online website or by phone, Social Security will never ask you for your credit card information or your PIN," Commissioner Jo Anne B. Barnhart reported.

SSA Inspector General O'Carroll recommended people always take precautions when giving out personal information. "You should never provide your Social Security number or other personal information over the Internet or by telephone unless you are extremely confident of the source to whom you are providing the information," O'Carroll said.

In August 2024, a class-action lawsuit was filed against National Public Data, claiming that the company permitted hackers to steal sensitive private information, including Social Security Numbers, covering millions of individuals. The theft was alleged to have occurred in April 2024. The stolen data contains records for people in the US, UK, and Canada.

=== Fraud in the acquisition and use of benefits ===
Given the vast size of the program, fraud sometimes occurs. The SSA has its own investigatory unit to combat and prevent fraud, the Cooperative Disability Investigations (CDI) Unit. Since its inception, the CDI Program has contributed $8.2 billion in savings to taxpayers. In addition, when investigating fraud in other SSA programs, the Social Security Administration may request investigatory assistance from other law enforcement agencies including the Office of the Inspector General as well as state and local authorities. As an additional anti-fraud measure, in 2025 the SSA eliminated the ability of a person to verify their identity via telephone (unless separately established by another online means) and required an in-person visit to an SSA field office to do so.

=== Restrictions on potentially deceptive communications ===
Because of the importance of Social Security to millions of Americans, many direct-mail marketers packaged their mailings to resemble official communications from the SSA, hoping recipients would be more likely to open them. In response, Congress amended the Social Security Act in 1988 to prohibit the private use of the phrase "Social Security" and several related terms in any way that would convey a false impression of approval from the SSA. The constitutionality of this law (42 U.S.C. § 1140) was upheld in United Seniors Association, Inc. v. Social Security Administration, 423 F.3d 397 (4th Cir. 2005), cert den 547 U.S. 1162; 126 S.Ct. 2346 (2006) (text at Findlaw).

== Public economics ==
=== Current recipients ===
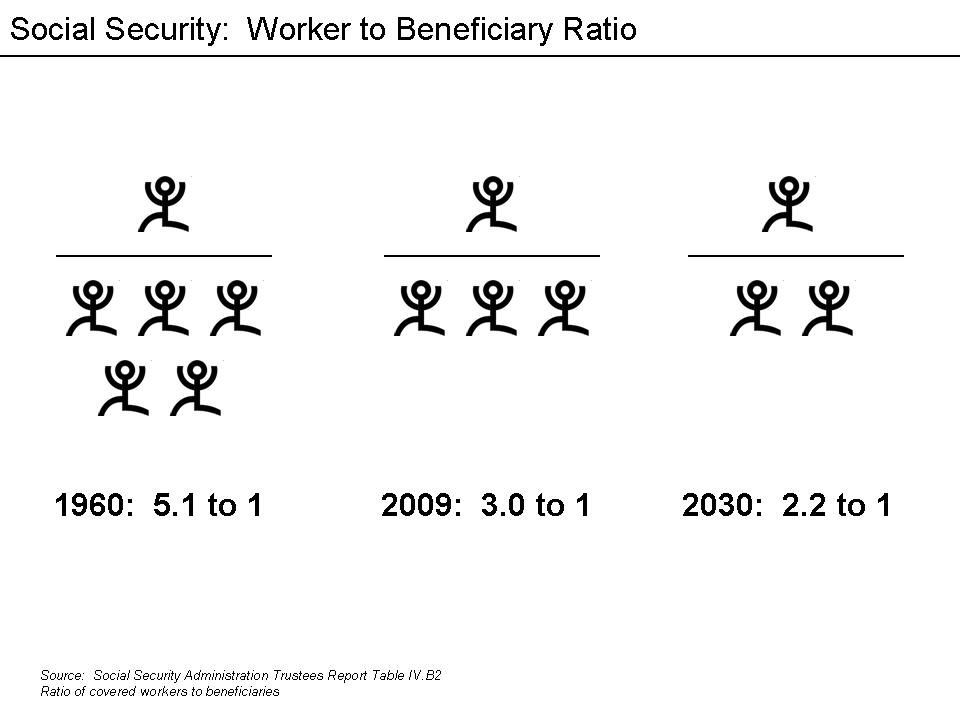
Social Security – the ratio of covered workers to retirees

The 2011 annual report by the program's Board of Trustees noted the following: in 2010, 54 million people were receiving Social Security benefits, while 157 million people were paying into the fund; of those receiving benefits, 44 million were receiving retirement benefits and 10 million disability benefits. In 2011, there will be 56 million beneficiaries and 158 million workers paying in. In 2010, total income was $781.1 billion and expenditures were $712.5 billion, which meant a total net increase in assets of $68.6 billion.

Assets in 2010 were $2.6 trillion, an amount that is expected to be adequate to cover the next ten years. In 2023, total income and interest earned on assets were projected to no longer cover expenditures for Social Security, as demographic shifts burden the system. By 2035, the ratio of potential retirees to working age persons will be 37 percent – there will be less than three potential income earners for every retiree in the population. At that rate the Social Security Trust Fund would be exhausted by 2036. In 2024, the estimated year in which funds would be exhausted was 2035.

In 2026 the shortfall year was moved up to 2032 according to the Trustees Report. The same year, it became a political issue in the 119th Congress. Current solutions to the shortfall include lifting the taxation cap on payroll, raising the retirement age, or a mix of other options.

=== Saving behavior ===
The average balances of retirement accounts, for households having such accounts, exceed median net worth across all age groups. For those 65 and over, 11.6% of retirement accounts have balances of at least $1 million, more than twice that of the $407,581 average (shown). Those 65 and over have a median net worth of about $250,000 (shown), about a quarter of the group's average (not shown).

Social Security affects the saving behavior of the people in three different ways. The wealth substitution effect occurs when a person saving for retirement recognizes that the Social Security system will take care of him and decreases his expectations about how much he needs to personally save. The retirement effect occurs when a taxpayer saves more each year in an effort to reduce the total number of years he must work to accumulate enough savings before retirement. The bequest effect occurs when a taxpayer recognizes a decrease in resources stemming from the Social Security tax and compensates by increasing personal savings to cover future expected costs of having children.

=== Reducing cost of living adjustment (COLA) ===
At present, a retiree's benefit is annually adjusted for inflation to reflect changes in the consumer price index. Some economists argue that the consumer price index overestimates price increases in the economy and therefore is not a suitable metric for adjusting benefits, while others argue that the CPI underestimates the effect of inflation on what retired people actually need to buy to live.

The current cost of living adjustment is based on the consumer price index for Urban Wage Earners and Clerical Workers (CPI-W). The Bureau of Labor Statistics routinely checks the prices of 211 different categories of consumption items in 38 geographical areas to compute 8,018 item-area indices. Many other indices are computed as weighted averages of these base indices. CPI-W is based on a market basket of goods and services consumed by urban wage earners and clerical workers. The weights for that index are updated in January of every even-numbered year.

People who say the CPI-W overestimates inflation recommend updating the weights each month; this produces the Chained Consumer Price Index for all urban consumers (C-CPI-U). People who say the C-CPI-U [or the unchained CPI for All Urban Consumers (CPI-U)] disadvantages the elderly, point out that seniors consume more medical care than younger people, and that the costs of medical care have been rising faster than inflation in other parts of the economy. According to this view, the costs of the things the elderly buy have been rising faster than the market basket averaged to obtain CPI-W, CPI-U or C-CPI-U. Some have recommended fixing this by using a CPI for the Elderly (CPI-E).

In 2003, economics researchers Hobijn and Lagakos estimated that the Social Security trust fund would run out of money in 40 years using CPI-W and in 35 years using CPI-E.

=== Consumption ===
According to a 2016 study in the American Economic Journal: Macroeconomics, the Social Security benefit increases from 1952 to 1991 have a "large, immediate, and significant positive response of consumption".

Among beneficiaries aged 65 and older, Social Security represents at least half of the income for 39% of men and 44% of women.

=== Health outcomes ===
According to a 2021 study, the expansion of old-age assistance under the 1935 Social Security Act reduced mortality among the elderly by 30–39%.

== See also ==
- Social policy
- List of Social Security lawsuits
- List of Social Security legislation (United States)
- 401(k)
- Federal Emergency Relief Administration
- Financing and benefit structure
- Goldberg v. Kelly
- Government operations
- Hall v. Sebelius
- Social Security Administration
  - Carolyn W. Colvin, Acting Commissioner (2013–2017)
  - Michael J. Astrue, Commissioner (2007–2013)
  - Health savings account
  - Individual retirement account
- National Organization of Social Security Claimants' Representatives (NOSSCR)
- Ownership society
- Richardson v. Perales
- Social Security debate (United States)
- Steward Machine Company v. Davis
- Supplemental Security Income
- SSA impersonation scam
- Charitable contribution deductions in the United States
- Invalidity, Old-Age and Survivors' Benefits Convention, 1967
