= Poyner v. Commissioner =

- Court: United States Court of Appeals for the Fourth Circuit
- Full case name: Ernest L. Poyner, et al v. Commissioner of Internal Revenue
- Argued: November 21, 1961
- Decided: March 21, 1962
- Citations: 301 F.2d 287 (4th Cir. 1962); 62-1 USTC (CCH) ¶ 9387

Court membership
- Judges sitting: Simon Sobeloff, Morris Ames Soper, J. Spencer Bell

Case opinions
- Majority: Sobeloff, joined by Soper, Bell

Laws applied
- Internal Revenue Code

Keywords
- Gift

Poyner v. Commissioner 301 F.2d 287 (4th Cir.1962) is a United States tax law case that discusses whether "special death benefits" paid to an employee's widow are exempt from taxes as a gift under §102(a).

It produces five factors as a pertinent test:

- (1) whether the payments were made to the spouse of the deceased shareholder, not to his estate;
- (2) whether the payor had been under no obligation to make the payments and had, in fact, decided on previous occasions not to make payments to persons qualified;
- (3) whether the company derived benefit of an economic nature from the payments;
- (4) whether the recipient had ever performed any services for the company;
- (5) whether the services of the deceased employee had been fully compensated during his lifetime.

== Citations ==
- Commissioner v. Duberstein, 363 U.S. 278 (1960)
- United States v. Kaiser, 363 U.S. 299 (1960)
- Bogardus v. Commissioner, 302 U.S. 34 (1937)
- Simpson v. United States, 261 F.2d 497 (7th Cir. 1958)
- Bounds v. United States, 262 F.2d 876 (4th Cir. 1958)
