= Poyner =

Poyner may refer to:

== People ==
- Bobby Poyner (born 1992), American baseball pitcher
- John Poyner (born 1933), English sound editor
- Syvasky Poyner (1956–1993), American spree killer

== Places ==
- Poyner Township, Black Hawk County, Iowa, a rural township

== Other uses ==
- Poyner v. Commissioner, a United States tax law case
