= Olk v. United States =

- Court: United States Court of Appeals for the Ninth Circuit
- Full case name: Olk v. United States
- Decided: June 1, 1976
- Citations: 536 F.2d 876; 76-2 USTC (CCH) ¶ 9484

Case history
- Subsequent history: Rehearing denied, July 14, 1976; cert. denied, 429 U.S. 920 (1976)

Holding
- District court decision reversed

Court membership
- Judges sitting: Alfred Goodwin, Joseph Tyree Sneed III, Robert Van Pelt (D. Neb.)

Case opinions
- Majority: Sneed, joined by Goodwin, Van Pelt

Laws applied
- Internal Revenue Code

Olk v. United States, 536 F.2d 876, 76-2 U.S. Tax Cas. (CCH) ¶ 9484 (9th Cir.), cert. denied, 429 U.S. 920, 97 S. Ct. 317 (1976), was a case decided before the United States Court of Appeals for the Ninth Circuit which dealt with the question of whether tips (or "tokes") to casino dealers were taxable as income to the dealers under Internal Revenue Code section 61 or, alternatively, nontaxable gifts under Internal Revenue Code section 102(a).

== Facts ==
In 1971, the plaintiff was employed as a craps dealer in two Las Vegas casinos. Dealers would at times receive money from the players as "tokes," which are similar to tips. The major difference between tips and "tokes" is that the casino workers do not perform specific services for customers. In fact, their contracts prohibited any such services other than the task of running the various games. This money would be collected and split evenly among the four dealers at the craps table at the end of each shift. This particular plaintiff received an average of $30 per day combined from his two casino jobs.

The district court in this case made two "findings of fact" that were relevant to the Court of Appeals decision. The first was that the tips were the result of "impulsive generosity" on the part of the players, and the second is that the tips were the result of "detached and disinterested generosity." These findings led the district court to find that the tips were gifts and not income for tax purposes under the test established in Commissioner v. Duberstein. This is relevant because gifts are not included in gross income for federal tax purposes.

== Issue ==
The issue in this case was whether the trial court erred in such "findings of fact" that led to the determination of holding that the tips to dealers were gifts and not income for federal tax purposes.

== Holding ==
The Court of Appeals for the Ninth Circuit reversed the trial court, holding that the tips did in fact constitute income, and the district court erred in making findings to the contrary.

== Reasoning ==
The Court began by stating that the conclusion that the tips were made out of "detached and disinterested generosity" was a conclusion of law, not a finding of fact, and as such the Court did not need to give any deference to the trial court's finding on that point. The court made a distinction between the lower court's determination of law and determination of fact. The determination of the dominant reason that explains the player's action in making the transfer was a matter of law for the lower court that would not be reversed because it was not clearly erroneous. The determination that such dominant reason requires tax treatment as a gift is one of law, to which the appeals court does not owe deference.

The Court decided that such payments by the players in casinos are not motivated by "detached or disinterested generosity," but instead was an "involved and intensely interested act" motivated by a hope that such a "tribute to the gods of fortune" would be "returned bounteously." The Court enumerated a number of factors to consider in making the determination that the tips should be reasonably regarded as compensation for services, including:

- the regularity of the flow
- the equal division of receipts, and
- the daily amount received

The Court announced a generalization that:

"receipts by taxpayers engaged in rendering services contributed by those with whom the taxpayers have some personal or functional contact in the course of the performance of the services are taxable income when in conformity with the practices of the area and easily valued."

Clearly, tips to dealers fit this description. As such, the tips should be included in gross income.

== Importance ==
The importance of this case is the creation of a set of factors that the Court created to evaluate these types of cases. While the giver's intention can be difficult to ascertain, objective factors like the regularity, division, and amount of tips are less subjective. Also, the Court made the easy leap from tips to "tokes," and indicated that the very strong similarity to tips made them income. This strong similarity exists, despite the fact that the casino workers are not "compensated" for performing any specific service to customers.
