= Totalization agreements =

Totalization agreements are international tax treaties that seek to eliminate dual taxation with regards to Social Security and Medicare taxes in the United States. These agreements are made in order to accommodate foreign workers who pay FICA taxes but receive no Social Security or Medicare benefits after reaching age 65. The agreements are made between the U.S. and other individual countries, and govern international taxpayers who earn money in the U.S. The goal of totalization agreements is to eliminate dual taxation on a foreigner's income made in the U.S. as well as provide proportional Social Security benefits for the same foreign workers. Issues considered to determine if a worker is covered under either Social Security and Medicare in the United States, or the social security system in a foreign country include where the worker resides and whether the employment in a foreign country is short-term or long-term. As of January 2025, the U.S. has 30 active totalization agreements.

== FICA tax ==
In 1935, Congress passed the Social Security Act. The act established a taxpayer-funded old-age pension. In the 1960s, Congress established Medicare, which provides taxpayer-funded health insurance to the elderly. In order to finance Social Security and Medicare, Congress passed the Federal Insurance Contributions Act, also known as FICA. Under FICA tax policy as of December 2017, the act mandates 3 different types of payroll taxes that employees have withheld from their paychecks: a 6.2% Social Security tax, a 1.45% Medicare tax, and, starting in 2013, a 0.9% Medicare tax for workers who make over $200,000 a year. Additionally, employers have to match any Social Security and Medicare taxes that their employees pay. All that totals to roughly a 12% Social Security tax and a 3% Medicare tax as a percentage of an employee's base paycheck.

== Purpose ==
A problem with the system of payroll taxes to fund old-age benefits is the effects of those taxes on foreign nationals. If someone from a foreign country works for a U.S. company in the U.S., that employee would have to pay FICA taxes. However, given that the worker is a foreign national, that worker is not eligible for U.S. old-age benefits, which only U.S. citizens or U.S. permanent residents are eligible for. That would be an unfair situation in that a foreign national would be paying into a system that they cannot derive benefit from. In addition, these nationals may also be subject to their home country's pension taxes, resulting in double taxation on the same income. Foreign residence can also result in gaps in pension benefits. The same problem of double taxation and a lack of benefits can also occur with U.S. citizens or permanent residents working abroad. Totalization agreements seek to remedy this problem of double taxation, as well as to fill in gaps in multiple country's old-age benefit programs. As of January 2025, the U.S. has entered into totalization agreements with 30 countries.

== General components ==
Totalization agreements that the U.S. enters into with other countries generally all have a few key components. Overall, totalization agreements eliminate dual social security coverage of workers in the U.S. and the other country they are from or work in. This involves exempting a worker from either the U.S. or the other country's taxation and benefits program. Many rules govern which nation's social security system covers a worker. One rule, the territoriality rule specifies that a worker is subject to the laws of the country in which he/she is working in. This rule is active in all U.S. agreements. Under this rule, a German citizen working and residing in the U.S. would pay FICA taxes and would eventually be eligible for Social Security and Medicare benefits from the United States.

Another rule, the detached-worker rule, governs foreign workers who are only temporarily stationed in the United States. A worker who has been temporarily transferred to work in the United States, for a period of up to five years, will remain subject to the social security system of his/her home country. This rule also applies if a worker goes from one foreign country to a different foreign country for an additional five years. The detached-worker rule is in all U.S. agreements with other countries except for its agreement with Italy. For example, if a worker from Germany is only temporarily stationed in the United States for a period of five years, that worker would not pay FICA taxes to the U.S. and would instead pay into the German social security system and eventually receive benefits from that system.

Workers who are self-employed in a foreign country are also subject to totalization agreements. These workers are usually subject to social security coverage of their place of residence. For example, a self-employed U.S. citizen living in Sweden will be covered by the Swedish social security system. However, exceptions do exist with regards to this part of the system.

Totalization agreements tolerate exceptions to the above rules in determining what social security system should govern a specific worker. If both countries agree to make an exception for an individual worker, then the country that agreed to cover the specific worker will accordingly cover that worker. An example of an exception would be if a short-term stay in a country was extended a few months over the five-year maximum allotted for the application of the detached-worker rule. An agreement between the two countries could be made to ignore the extra three months the worker spent in the foreign country. That would prevent the worker in question from being subject to taxes from the country he/she works in. Instead, that worker would continue to be subjected to the social security system of his/her home country.

The U.S. determines what totalization benefits a foreign national can receive based on how long that foreign national has been in the country and how long that foreign national has worked in his/her home country. The U.S. has a threshold for the time needed to work in order to receive full Social Security and Medicare benefits. With countries it has entered into a totalization agreement with, the U.S. will count foreign time worked towards the threshold. If the combined total exceeds the threshold, the U.S. will then pay partial payments to the recipients.

== Comparison to foreign systems ==
While the United States uses tax treaties in order to manage the social security coverage with foreign nations, other regions of the world do things differently. For example, the European Union has a system in which workers may pay taxes to a multitude of member nations' systems. The system will then total all the contributions a worker made into the system. A worker will then be granted full social security benefits based on total contributions made throughout the continent.
