= Commissioner v. Duberstein =

- Supreme Court of the United States

Argued March 23, 1960 Decided June 13, 1960
- Full case name: Commissioner of Internal Revenue v. Duberstein, et ux.
- Citations: 363 U.S. 278 (more) 80 S.Ct. 1190; 4 L. Ed. 2d 1218; 5 A.F.T.R.2d 1626; 60-2 USTC (CCH) ¶ 9515; 1960-2 C.B. 428

Case history
- Prior: T.C. Memo. 1958-4; 265 F.2d 28 (6th Cir. 1959)

Holding
- The court upheld the Tax court's ruling with regards to Duberstein but split as to Stanton.

Court membership
- Chief Justice Earl Warren Associate Justices Hugo Black · Felix Frankfurter; William O. Douglas · Tom C. Clark; John M. Harlan II · William J. Brennan Jr. Charles E. Whittaker · Potter Stewart

Case opinions
- Majority: Brennan
- Concur/dissent: Frankfurter, joined by Harlan
- Concur/dissent: Black
- Dissent: Douglas

Commissioner v. Duberstein, 363 U.S. 278 (1960), was a United States Supreme Court case from 1960 dealing with the exclusion of "the value of property acquired by gift" from the gross income of an income taxpayer.

It is notable (and thus appears frequently in law school casebooks) for the following holdings:

- When determining whether something is a gift for U.S. federal income tax purposes, the critical consideration is the transferor's intention. This is a question of fact that must be determined on a "case-by-case basis". The body that levies the tax must conduct an objective inquiry that looks to "the mainsprings of human conduct to the totality of the fact of each case." On review, the trier of fact must consider all of the evidence in front of it and determine whether the transferor's intention was either disinterested or involved:
  - Gifts result from "detached and disinterested generosity" and are often given out of "affection, respect, admiration, charity or like impulses".
  - Contrast payments given as an "involved and intensely interested" act.

== Facts ==
The Court was presented with two sets of facts.

=== No. 376, Commissioner v. Duberstein ===
Berman was president of Mohawk Metal Corporation. Duberstein was president of the Duberstein Iron & Metal Company. They would often talk on the phone and give each other names of potential customers. After receiving some particularly helpful information, Berman decided to give Duberstein a gift of a Cadillac. Although Duberstein said he did not need the car as he already had a Cadillac and an Oldsmobile, he eventually accepted it. Mohawk Metal Corporation later deducted the value of the car as a business expense, but Duberstein did not include the value of the Cadillac in his gross income when he filed his tax return, deeming it a gift. The Commissioner asserted a deficiency for the car's value against Duberstein. The Tax court affirmed.

=== No. 546, Stanton v. United States ===
Stanton worked for the Trinity Church in New York City as the comptroller of the Church corporation and president of the corporation. He resigned from both positions to go into business for himself. As a "gratuity" the corporation's directors awarded Stanton $20,000 in appreciation of the services rendered. While some directors testified that Stanton had been well liked by all in the Vestry and the $20,000 was a gift to show that good will, there was also some evidence given that Stanton was being forced to resign. The trial judge made a simple finding that the payments were a "gift".

== The Issues ==
Was the car that Duberstein received a gift for taxation purposes?

Was the money that Stanton received a gift for taxation purposes?

== Holdings ==
Justice William J. Brennan, Jr., for the majority, upheld the Tax court's ruling with regard to Duberstein: Duberstein's car was not a gift, because the motives were certainly not "disinterested"—it was given to compensate for past customer references or to encourage future references. Duberstein at 291–92.

The court split as to Stanton. A plurality remanded Stanton's situation back to the trial court, to determine whether the Vestry intended to give the money as a gift or as compensation. Id. at 292.

=== Reasoning ===
The Court first rejected the premise that a "gift" for taxation purposes was the same as "gift" in common law terms. Duberstein at 285. The Court also rejected the premise that there is a bright line as to what constitutes a gift for taxation purposes. Id at 287.

Instead, when determining whether something is a gift for taxation purposes, the critical consideration is the transferor's intention. Duberstein at 285-286 (citing Bogardus v. Commissioner, 302 U.S. 34 (1937)). This is a question of fact that must be determined on a "case-by-case basis". Duberstein at 290. The body that levies the tax must conduct an objective inquiry that looks to "the mainsprings of human conduct to the totality of the fact of each case." Duberstein at 289. The trier of fact must consider all of the evidence in front of it and determine whether the transferor's intention was either disinterested or involved:

- Gifts result from "detached and disinterested generosity." Duberstein at 285 (quoting Commissioner of Internal Revenue v. LoBue, 351 U.S. 243 (1956)). Gifts are often given out of "affection, respect, admiration, charity or like impulses." Duberstein at 285 (quoting Robertson v. United States, 343 U.S. 711, 714 (1952).
- Contrast payments given as an "involved and intensely interested" act. See Olk v. United States, 536 F.2d 876 (9th Cir. 1976).

== Justice Whittaker's concurrence ==
Justice Whittaker wrote separately to opine that sometimes, whether something is a gift is a mixed question of fact and law, not strictly a fact question as the majority wrote. Id. at 293.

== Justice Douglas's dissent ==
Justice Douglas dissented. He believed that both were gifts. Id.

== Justice Black's concurrence and dissent ==
While siding with the majority on Duberstein, Justice Black believed that Stanton's money was a gift. Id. at 294.

== Justice Frankfurter's concurrence and dissent ==
While siding with the majority on Duberstein, Justice Frankfurter believed that Stanton's money was definitely not a gift because it was given to him as a result of his hard work. Id. at 297–98. He explained that when "[T]hings of value [are] given to employees by their employers upon the termination of employment" or when an employer gives "payments entangled in a business relation and occasioned by the performance of some service," a " strong implication is that the payment is of a business nature" and, therefore, not a gift. Id. at 295–296.

== See also ==
- List of United States Supreme Court cases, volume 363
- Bogardus v. Commissioner, 302 U.S. 34 (1937)
