= Miner v. Atlass =

- Supreme Court of the United States

Decided June 20, 1960
- Full case name: Miner v. Atlass
- Citations: 363 U.S. 641 (more)

Holding
- A court of admiralty has no inherent power, independent of any statute or rule, to order the taking of depositions for the purpose of discovery.

Court membership
- Chief Justice Earl Warren Associate Justices Hugo Black · Felix Frankfurter; William O. Douglas · Tom C. Clark; John M. Harlan II · William J. Brennan Jr. Charles E. Whittaker · Potter Stewart

Miner v. Atlass, 363 U.S. 641 (1960), was a United States Supreme Court case in which the court held that a court of admiralty has no inherent power, independent of any statute or rule, to order the taking of depositions for the purpose of discovery. The court also held that the local rule authorizing the deposition was invalid.
