= List of United States Supreme Court cases, volume 363 =

This is a list of all the United States Supreme Court cases from volume 363 of the United States Reports:

Case name	Citation	Date decided
United States v. Louisiana (1960)	363 U.S. 1	1960
United States v. Florida	363 U.S. 121	1960
Senior v. Zoning Comm'n	363 U.S. 143	1960
Garfinkle v. Garfinkle	363 U.S. 143	1960
de Veau v. Braisted	363 U.S. 144	1960
FTC v. Henry Broch & Co.	363 U.S. 166	1960
Kreshik v. Russian Orthodox Church	363 U.S. 190	1960
Douglas v. Green	363 U.S. 192	1960
United States v. Mfg. Nat'l Bank	363 U.S. 194	1960
Pa. R.R. Co. v. United States	363 U.S. 202	1960
Clay v. Sun Ins. Office Ltd.	363 U.S. 207	1960
United States v. Grand River Dam Auth.	363 U.S. 229	1960
United States v. Brosnan	363 U.S. 237	1960
Tex. Gas Transmission Corp. v. Shell Oil Co.	363 U.S. 263	1960
Commi'r v. Duberstein	363 U.S. 278	1960
United States v. Kaiser	363 U.S. 299	1960
Hoffman v. Blaski	363 U.S. 335	1960
Parr v. United States	363 U.S. 370	1960
Kimm v. Rosenberg	363 U.S. 405	1960
DeFoe v. Suchman	363 U.S. 417	1960
SEC v. Lea Fabrics, Inc.	363 U.S. 417	1960
Levitt & Sons, Inc. v. Division Against Discrimination in State Dept. of Ed.	363 U.S. 418	1960
Bernstein v. Real Estate Comm'n	363 U.S. 419	1960
Hannah v. Larche	363 U.S. 420	1960
Aquilino v. United States	363 U.S. 509	1960
United States v. Durham Lumber Co.	363 U.S. 522	1960
Locomotive Engineers v. Mo.-Kan.-Tex. R.R. Co.	363 U.S. 528	1960
FTC v. Anheuser-Busch, Inc.	363 U.S. 536	1960
Metlakatla Indian Community v. Egan	363 U.S. 555	1960
Steelworkers v. Am. Mfg. Co.	363 U.S. 564	1960
Steelworkers v. Warrior & Gulf Nav. Co.	363 U.S. 574	1960
Steelworkers v. Enterprise Wheel & Car Corp.	363 U.S. 593	1960
Flemming v. Nestor	363 U.S. 603	1960
Miner v. Atlass	363 U.S. 641	1960
Schilling v. Rogers	363 U.S. 666	1960
United States v. Am.-Foreign S.S. Corp.	363 U.S. 685	1960
Hudson v. North Carolina	363 U.S. 697	1960
Cory Corp. v. Sauber	363 U.S. 709	1960
Greenwald v. Maryland	363 U.S. 719	1960
Anderson v. Thorington Constr. Co.	363 U.S. 719	1960
Am. Legion v. Pennsylvania	363 U.S. 720	1960
Greenwald v. Maryland	363 U.S. 721	1960
