= Vocational expert =

A vocational expert is an authority in the areas of vocational rehabilitation, vocational and earning capacity, lost earnings, cost of replacement labor and lost ability/time in performing household services. They perform evaluations for purposes of civil litigation, as an aspect of economic damages.

Vocational experts utilize court-respected methodologies to make determinations regarding employability and earning capacity. Employability is a term that describes an individual's capacity for work, such that there is a demand for work to be completed, and an individual possesses the capacity to perform the work, or possesses the aptitude to learn to perform the work. Earning capacity is a term that describes an individual's potential to engage in gainful activities to earn money. In personal injury matters, vocational experts can render reports and offer testimony regarding pre- and post-injury employability and earning capacity. See: https://kwvrs.com/attorneys-vocational-forensic-evaulations/

Vocational experts identify what the person could have earned prior to the incident, compared to what they are likely to earn following the incident. Economic experts calculate the value of those earnings over time, so the difference, if any, between the two income streams is clearly understood. Those who act as vocational/economic experts blend the two disciplines, and offer testimony in both arenas.

A vocational "expert" is designated by an attorney as an expert who testifies in court, whereas a vocational "consultant" does not testify. Qualifications to testify in court as an expert in the field of vocational rehabilitation are fairly strict and related to State certification and licensure. Typically, a graduate degree in counseling or psychology plus certification/licensure will suffice. Ultimately, the rules of evidence in the jurisdiction presiding over the civil case prevail.

== See also ==
- Economic damages
- Forensic economics
- forensic economist
