= United States v. Kaiser =

- Supreme Court of the United States

Argued March 23, 1960 Decided June 13, 1960
- Full case name: United States v. Kaiser
- Citations: 363 U.S. 299 (more) 80 S. Ct. 1204; 4 L. Ed. 2d 1233; 1960 U.S. LEXIS 1925; 60-2 U.S. Tax Cas. (CCH) ¶ 9517; 5 A.F.T.R.2d (RIA) 1611; 1960-2 C.B. 33; 46 L.R.R.M. 2350

Case history
- Prior: 262 F.2d 367 (affirmed)

Court membership
- Chief Justice Earl Warren Associate Justices Hugo Black · Felix Frankfurter; William O. Douglas · Tom C. Clark; John M. Harlan II · William J. Brennan Jr. Charles E. Whittaker · Potter Stewart

Case opinions
- Plurality: Brennan, joined by Warren, Black, Douglas
- Concurrence: Frankfurter (in result), joined by Clark
- Concurrence: Douglas
- Dissent: Whittaker, joined by Harlan, Stewart

Laws applied
- Internal Revenue Code

United States v. Kaiser, 363 U.S. 299 (1960), was an income tax case before the United States Supreme Court.

== Background ==
Union and non-union strikers were provided limited financial assistance by a union.

When a non-union taxpayer filed his tax form, he did not include the amount of the assistance in his gross income. The taxpayer paid the additional tax owed and after an administrative rejection of his refund claim, sued for the refund in the United States district court for the Eastern District of Wisconsin.

A jury found that the financial assistance was a gift, excluding it from income under § 102(a) of the Internal Revenue Code, but a judgment notwithstanding the verdict was granted to the government. Then a United States Court of Appeals for the Seventh Circuit reversed a district court's grant of a judgment notwithstanding the verdict against respondent taxpayer.

By a divided vote, the United States Court of Appeals for the Seventh Circuit reversed. 262 F.2d 367. It held alternatively that the assistance was not within the concept of income of § 61 (a) of the Code, and that in any event the jury's determination that the assistance was a gift, and hence excluded from gross income by § 102 (a), had rational support in the evidence and accordingly was within its province as trier of the facts.

The court granted the government's petition for certiorari, because of the importance of the issues presented. 359 U.S. 1010.

== Opinion of the Court ==
The Court upheld the appellate court's decision but declined to decide whether the assistance was a gift because the government did not object to the jury charge regarding the gift exclusion. The Court held that the proof was adequate to support the conclusion of the jury. The Court held that, in an allocation of power to decide the question, once it has been found that the decision could reasonably be reached on the evidence and the district court's instructions were not overthrown, the Court's reviewing authority was exhausted. The Court held that the jury was empowered to render the verdict that it did.

The United States Supreme Court affirmed the judgment below, six members of the Court agreeing that the jury had properly found that the strike assistance was an excludable gift. There was no opinion by a majority of the court. Brennan, J., announced the judgment of the court and delivered an opinion, sustaining excludability, in which he was joined by Warren, Ch. J., and Black and Douglas, JJ. In a separate opinion, Frankfurter, J., joined by Clark, J., concurred in the result. Douglas, J., filed a separate concurring opinion. Whittaker, J., dissented in an opinion in which he was joined by Harlan and Stewart, JJ
