= Jo Anne B. Barnhart =

American politician

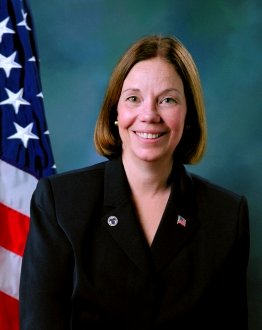
- Official portrait, 2001

14th Commissioner of the Social Security Administration
- In office November 9, 2001 – January 20, 2007
- President: George W. Bush
- Preceded by: Larry Massanari (acting)
- Succeeded by: Linda S. McMahon (acting)

Personal details
- Born: January 1, 1950 (age 76) Memphis, Tennessee, U.S.
- Party: Republican
- Education: University of Delaware (BA)

Jo Anne Bryant Barnhart (born January 1, 1950) was the 14th commissioner of the Social Security Administration, filling a six-year term of office that ran through January 19, 2007.

== Biography ==
She was nominated by President George W. Bush on July 17, and confirmed by the United States Senate on November 2, 2001. On February 1, 2007, the Senate confirmed Michael J. Astrue to replace Mrs. Barnhart for a six-year term beginning on January 20, 2007.

As head of the Social Security Administration (SSA), she was responsible for administering the Social Security programs (retirement, survivors and disability), as well as the Supplemental Security Income (SSI) program.

During her term, the Social Security Administration provided financial protection to more than 158 million workers and their families, and more than 48 million Americans receive monthly Social Security retirement, disability or survivors benefits. The SSI program paid monthly benefits to more than 7 million Americans who have little or no resources and who are aged, blind or disabled. During her tenure, SSA developed and implemented the Electronic Disability System (e-Dib). Within one year of implementation e-Dib was the largest repository of medical records in the world.

Before her appointment by President Bush, Commissioner Barnhart served for more than four years as a member of the Social Security Advisory Board, an independent body created to advise the Congress on Social Security issues and policies.

A former SSA employee, Mrs. Barnhart worked in the Office of Family Assistance from 1981–1986, first as Deputy Associate Commissioner and then as Associate Commissioner. She served as minority staff director for the Senate Committee on Governmental Affairs from 1986–1990. From 1990–1993, she served as Assistant Secretary for Children and Families at the Department of Health and Human Services, overseeing more than 65 programs, including Aid to Families with Dependent Children.

During her career, Mrs. Barnhart served as Senator William V. Roth, Jr.’s legislative assistant (1977–1981) and as his campaign manager (1988, 1994 and 2000), she was political director of the National Republican Senatorial Committee (NRSC; 1995–1996) and managed her own political and public policy consulting firm.

A graduate of the University of Delaware, Commissioner Barnhart was born in Memphis, Tennessee. She has been an adjunct lecturer at the John F. Kennedy School of Government, Harvard University since 2008 where she teaches a course on designing social security programs. She lives in Florida with her husband, David.

Political offices
Preceded by Larry Massanari; Acting	Commissioner of the Social Security Administration; 2001–2007	Succeeded by Linda S. McMahon; Acting
