= Flemming v. Nestor =

- Supreme Court of the United States

Argued February 24, 1960 Decided June 20, 1960
- Full case name: Arthur Sherwood Flemming, Secretary of Health, Education, and Welfare v. Ephram Nestor
- Citations: 363 U.S. 603 (more) 80 S. Ct. 1367; 4 L. Ed. 2d 1435; 1960 U.S. LEXIS 917

Holding
- Nestor's constitutional rights were not violated by denial of Social Security benefits under a provision relating to deported persons.

Court membership
- Chief Justice Earl Warren Associate Justices Hugo Black · Felix Frankfurter; William O. Douglas · Tom C. Clark; John M. Harlan II · William J. Brennan Jr. Charles E. Whittaker · Potter Stewart

Case opinions
- Majority: Harlan, joined by Frankfurter, Clark, Whittaker, Stewart
- Dissent: Black
- Dissent: Douglas
- Dissent: Brennan, joined by Warren, Douglas

Laws applied
- U.S. Const. amend. V

Flemming v. Nestor, 363 U.S. 603 (1960), was a United States Supreme Court case in which the Court upheld the constitutionality of Section 1104 of the 1935 Social Security Act. In this Section, Congress reserved to itself the power to amend and revise the schedule of benefits. The Court rejected that Social Security is a system of 'accrued property rights' and held that those who pay into the system have no contractual right to receive what they have paid into it.

== Background ==
A 1954 amendment to the Social Security Act stripped old-age benefits from contributors who were deported under the Immigration and Nationality Act. The following year Ephram Nestor, an alien from Bulgaria who had paid into Social Security for 19 years, began drawing benefits. Nestor was subsequently deported for involvement in the Communist Party, and his benefits were terminated. He sued the Department of Health, Education, and Welfare on the basis that the amendment had deprived him of a property interest in Social Security without due process and was therefore invalid.

== Opinion of the Court ==
The Court ruled that there is no contractual right to receive Social Security payments. Payments due under Social Security are not “property” and are not protected by the Takings Clause of the Fifth Amendment. The interest of a beneficiary of Social Security is protected only by the Due Process Clause.

Under Due Process Clause analysis, government action is valid unless it is patently arbitrary and utterly lacking in rational justification. This provision of §202(n) is not irrational; it could have been justified by the desire to increase the purchasing power of those living in America, because those living abroad would not spend their payments domestically.

== Critique ==
The case has been criticized on many grounds. In dissent, Justice Black argued that the Court's holding was motivated by anti-communist bias. Charles A. Reich likened the Flemming majority's construction to feudal tenure and posed whether constitutional rights could be secure if the government might deny a person's livelihood by asserting a public interest. Reich's critique informed the Court's decision in Goldberg v. Kelly, which held that the government must provide due process.
