= Hall v. Sebelius =

2012 in United States case law

- Court: United States Court of Appeals for the District of Columbia Circuit
- Full case name: Brian Hall, et al., Appellants v. Kathleen Sebelius, Secretary Of The United States Department Of Health And Human Services, and Michael J. Astrue, Commissioner of the Social Security Administration, Appellees
- Argued: October 13, 2011
- Decided: February 7, 2012
- Citation: 667 F.3d 1293 (D.C. Cir. 2012)

Holding
- Because people are not required to use their Medicare benefits, they cannot be allowed to cancel Medicare coverage without also cancelling Social Security benefits.

Court membership
- Judges sitting: Douglas H. Ginsburg, Brett Kavanaugh, Karen L. Henderson

Case opinions
- Majority: Kavanaugh, joined by Ginsburg
- Dissent: Henderson

Hall v. Sebelius, 667 F.3d 1293 (D.C. Cir. 2012), was a D.C. Circuit case decided in February 2012 involving the question of whether or not the Secretary of Health, then Kathleen Sebelius, is required to provide a means for those with Social Security benefits to terminate Medicare benefits.

Brian Hall, along with the other petitioners, had made full payments into Social Security accounts. They were therefore automatically entitled into Medicare. However, they did not invoke its use and preferred their own private health insurance. However, statutes allowed this only if they also gave up Social Security, and they did not wish to also cancel their Social Security benefits. The court ruled that since they were not required to use their Medicare benefits, they could not be allowed to cancel Medicare coverage without also cancelling Social Security benefits.

== Background ==
In 1965 Congress amended the Social Security Act to establish the Medicare program. The criteria for receiving Medicare benefits were:

1. At least 65 years of age
2. Is entitled to Social Security payments

Under this provision, if an individual were eligible for Social Security, they would automatically be entitled to Medicare. The Medicare act was later amended to allow those not automatically entitled via Social Security to apply and enroll through another process. The Programs Operations Manual System called for termination protocol. It explains that if someone is no longer entitled to, or wishes to end, Social Security benefits they must begin the process and pay back all accrued payments. Said person is therefore also no longer entitled to Medicare benefits. Accordingly, to disclaim Medicare, one must first disclaim Social Security and repay all payments. The Secretary of Health and Human Services, however, declared that one is not required to use Medicare benefits if they are using Social Security benefits.

Brian Hall, John Kraus, and Richard Armey, all former public federal employees, were all entitled to both Social Security and Medicare. They desired to end all Medicare benefits since it interfered with their private medical insurance, and petitioned to the Secretary of Health and Human Services, Kathleen Sebelius, that the protocol requiring them to keep those benefits despite not exercising them was in error and should be overruled, alleging that the Social Security act and the Medicare act were in conflict.

Hall et al. appealed the case once more to the US Federal Circuit for a writ of certiorari.

== Case ==
The court considered whether or not the Secretary of Health was required by legal statute to offer a means of individuals to opt out of Medicare without opting out of Social Security. It was believed that since exercising Medicare was not required, it was not infringing or violating rights in any way.

The district court awarded summary judgement to the government and Sebelius. The court believed Hall and the other petitioners could only forego Medicare by foregoing all Social Security benefits. The court affirmed this decision, citing that persons were not required to use Medicare benefits.

== Decision ==
The Court believed that since Medicare was not required to be used, but was freely offered to an individual with Social Security, there were not contradicting statutes in the respective acts.

The Court reasoned that, under the Medicare statute, the plaintiffs were legally entitled to benefits - regardless of whether they were accepted. First, they dismissed as unpersuasive the plaintiffs' argument that "entitlement" implied the ability to reject the benefits. The Court also disagreed with the plaintiffs on their second argument, concluding that the "voluntary" nature of benefits did not create a statutory right to disclaim them. Next, the Court reasoned that the current regulatory scheme did not make Medicare benefits a prerequisite for Social Security benefits (in fact, just the opposite). Finally, the Court dismissed the plaintiffs' argument about the nature of Medicare benefits as "optional."

The Court concluded that the plaintiffs' position was inconsistent with the statutory text, and that they had no right to disclaim benefits without also disclaiming (and paying back) Social Security benefits.

The court therefore affirmed the lower court's decision and denied Hall the writ of certiorari. The Secretary of Health is in no way required to provide a way to opt out of Medicare without opting out of Social Security.

== Significance ==
This case set a precedent for those with Medicare benefits seeking private insurance that does not allow other providers. Allowing Medicare must come from the private insurers end, rather than the government cancelling an automatic service. Medicare and Social Security are also considered to be verily inseparable, and cannot be separated from one another, since Medicare is an automatic service along with Social Security.
