= Bogardus v. Commissioner =

- Supreme Court of the United States

Argued October 18, 1937 Decided November 8, 1937
- Full case name: Bogardus v. Commissioner of Internal Revenue
- Citations: 302 U.S. 34 (more) 58 S. Ct. 61; 82 L. Ed. 32, 37-2 USTC (CCH) ¶ 9534; 19 A.F.T.R. 1195; 1937-2 C.B. 258

Case history
- Prior: Bogardus v. Helvering, 88 F.2d 646 (2d Cir. 1937); cert. granted, 301 U.S. 674 (1937).

Holding
- That a distribution of money by a corporation, by a resolution passed by the board of directors and stockholders, to the company's past and present employees who had no ties with the corporation, in recognition of their past service was a non-taxable gift which the company received no servers for so it was not "compensation for personal services".

Court membership
- Chief Justice Charles E. Hughes Associate Justices James C. McReynolds · Louis Brandeis; George Sutherland · Pierce Butler; Harlan F. Stone · Owen Roberts; Benjamin N. Cardozo · Hugo Black

Case opinions
- Majority: Sutherland, joined by McReynolds, Butler, Roberts, Hughes
- Dissent: Brandeis, joined by Stone, Cardozo, Black

Laws applied
- 26 U.S.C. § 22

Bogardus v. Commissioner, 302 U.S. 34 (1937), was a United States Supreme Court case discussing, under United States tax law, how to distinguish compensation from tax-exempt gifts under § 102(a). It is notable (and thus appears frequently in law school casebooks) for the following holdings:

- A payment cannot be both "compensation for personal service" within the meaning of § 22(a) of the Revenue Act of 1928 and a "gift" under (b)(3) of the same section. Old Colony Trust Co. v. Commissioner, distinguished.
- Payments made to present and former employees of a corporation by its former stockholders, acting through a new corporation which had taken over part of the property of the other, HELD: not "compensation for personal services," taxable to the recipients as income under § 22(a) of the Revenue Act of 1928, but "gifts," exempted from taxation by subdivision (b)(3) of that section.

Nothing connected the donees (or the old corporation) to the donors (and their new corporation). The gifts were made, without any legal or moral obligation, not for any consideration or for services rendered, but as acts of spontaneous generosity in appreciation of past loyalty of the donees which had benefited the donors when stockholders of the older company.

- When the facts and circumstances prove an intent to make a gift, the erroneous use of the terms "honorarium" and "bonus" cannot convert the gift into a payment for services.
- A gift is no less a gift because inspired by gratitude for the past faithful service of the recipient.

== Issue ==
Is a sum of money paid to former stockholders and employees compensation which is subject to Federal Income Tax or a gift that is exempt from taxes?

== Opinion of the Court ==
The term "gift" in §102(a) is largely to be defined by reference to the motives of the payor. If the payment, though voluntary, is "in return for services rendered," or proceeds from "the constraining force of any moral or legal duty," or anticipates a "benefit" to the payor, then it is taxable to the payee even if characterized as a "gift" by the payor.

On the other hand, if the payment proceeds from a "detached and disinterested generosity," if it is made "out of affection, respect ... or like impulses," then it is an excludable gift even though the relationship between payor and payee has previously been in a business context.

== See also ==
- Commissioner v. Duberstein cites this case
