= Fiona Devine =

Professor of sociology

Fiona Devine CBE FAcSS
- Born: 6 June 1962 (age 64)

Academic background
- Education: University of Essex
- Thesis: Privatism and the working class: affluent workers in the 1980s? (1990)

Academic work
- Institutions: University of Manchester; Manchester Business School
- Main interests: Sociology
- Website: http://www.mbs.ac.uk/research/people/profiles/FDevine

Fiona Devine CBE FAcSS (born 6 June 1962) is a professor of sociology at the University of Manchester and vice-president and Dean of the Faculty of Humanities at the University of Manchester.

== Education ==
Devine's degrees, master's and doctorate were all gained from the University of Essex.

== Career ==
Devine is best known for sociology writings about a new model of class structures: seven classes ranging from the Elite at the top to a Precariat at the bottom. She collaborated with the BBC website BBC Lab UK on the Great British Class Survey. More generally Devine specialises in social stratification and mobility; class identity; and in gender, work and family. She is co-director of the Centre for Research on Socio-Cultural Change at Manchester.

== Awards ==
She was awarded an OBE for Services to Social Sciences in 2010 and elected to the Academy of Social Sciences in 2011. She was appointed a Commander of the Order of the British Empire in the 2019 New Year Honours for services to the Social Sciences.

== Selected bibliography ==
=== Books ===
- Devine, Fiona; Waters, Mary C. (2004). Social inequalities in comparative perspective. Malden, Massachusetts: Blackwell Publishing. ISBN 9780631226857.
- Devine, Fiona; Savage, Mike; Scott, John; Crompton, Rosemary (2005). Rethinking class: culture, identities and lifestyles. Basingstoke, Hampshire New York: Palgrave Macmillan. ISBN 9780333968956.

=== Book chapters ===
- Devine, Fiona; Waters, Mary C. (2004), "Introduction", in Devine, Fiona; Waters, Mary C. (eds.), Social inequalities in comparative perspective, Malden, Massachusetts: Blackwell Publishing, pp. 1–19, ISBN 9780631226857.
- Devine, Fiona (2004), "Talking about class in Britain", in Devine, Fiona; Waters, Mary C. (eds.), Social inequalities in comparative perspective, Malden, Massachusetts: Blackwell Publishing, pp. 191–213, ISBN 9780631226857.

=== Journal articles ===
- Devine, Fiona; Snee, Helene (2014). "Taking the next step: Class, resources and educational choice across the generations" (PDF). Journal of Youth Studies. 17 (8): 998–1013. doi:10.1080/13676261.2014.881987. S2CID 144672757.
- Devine, Fiona; Snee, Helene (May 2015). "Doing the Great British class survey". The Sociological Review. 63 (2): 240–258. doi:10.1111/1467-954X.12282.
- Devine, Fiona (2016). "The working class, middle class, assimilation and convergence". The Sociological Review. (Monograph series.)
- Devine, Fiona; Sensler, Marianne (January–March 2017). "Class, politics and the progressive dilemma". The Political Quarterly. 88 (1): 30–38. doi:10.1111/1467-923X.12331.
