= Federal Insurance Contributions Act =

US federal payroll tax to fund Social Security and Medicare

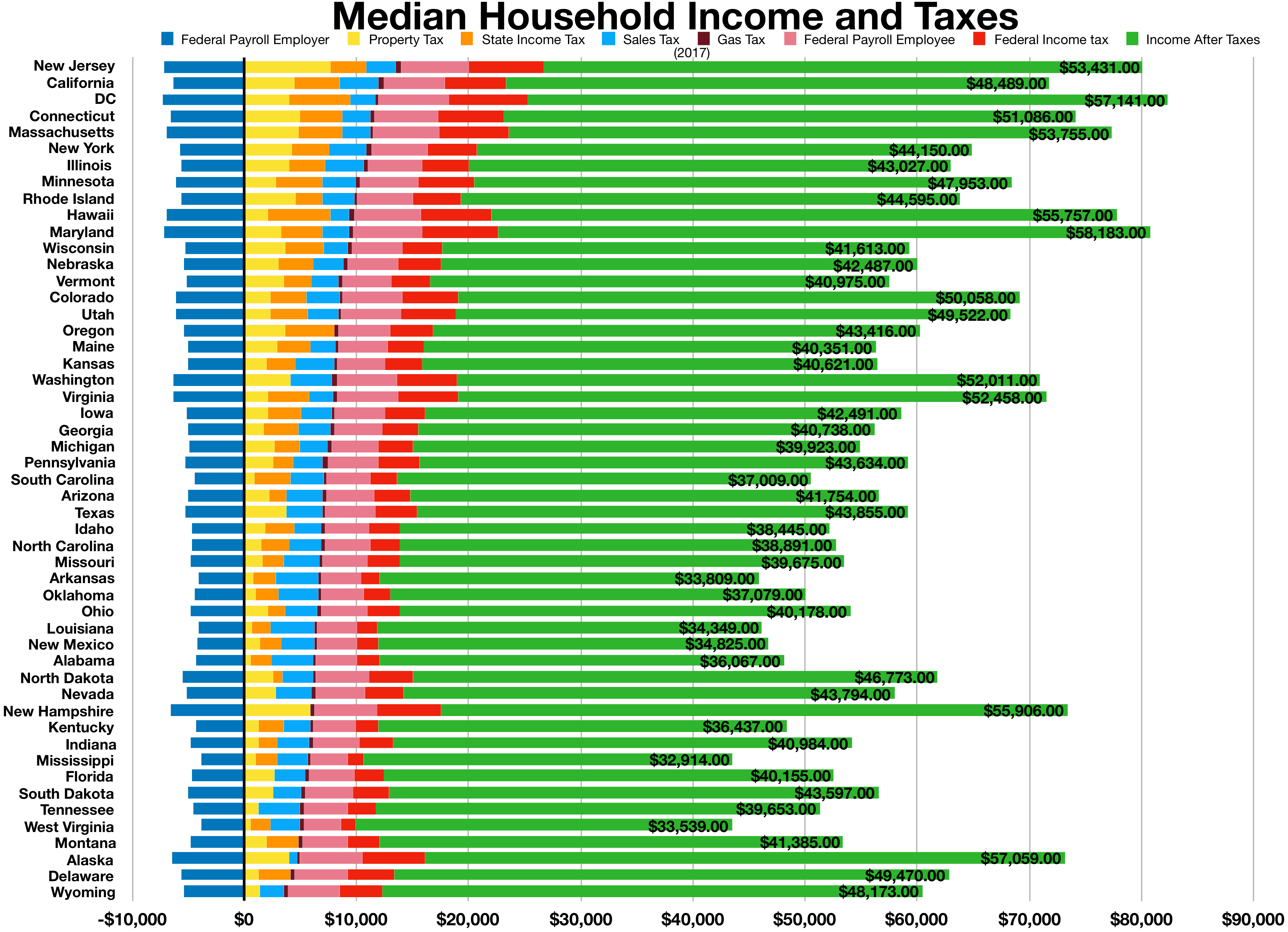
Median household income and taxes

The Federal Insurance Contributions Act (FICA /ˈfaɪkə/) is a United States federal payroll (or employment) tax payable by both employees and employers to fund Social Security and Medicare—federal programs that provide benefits for retirees, people with disabilities, and children of deceased workers.

== Calculation ==
=== Overview ===
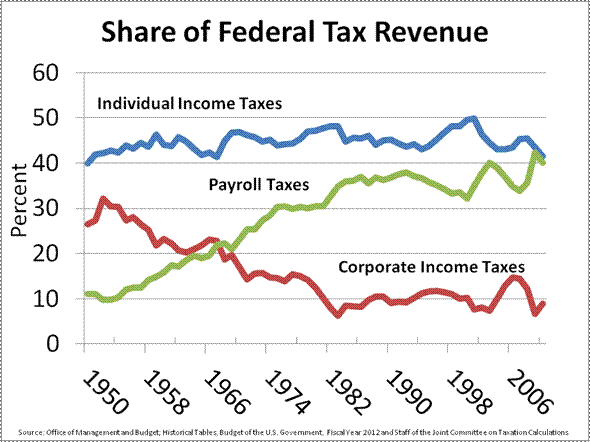
Share of federal revenue from different tax sources. Individual income taxes (blue), payroll taxes/FICA (green), corporate income taxes (red).

The Federal Insurance Contributions Act is a tax mechanism codified in Title 26, Subtitle C, Chapter 21 of the United States Code.

Social security benefits include old-age, survivors, and disability insurance (OASDI); Medicare provides hospital insurance benefits for the elderly. The amount that one pays in payroll taxes throughout one's working career is associated indirectly with the social security benefits annuity that one receives as a retiree. Consequently, Kevin Hassett wrote that FICA is not a tax because its collection is directly tied to benefits that one is entitled to collect later in life. However, the United States Supreme Court ruled in Flemming v. Nestor (1960) that the Social Security system is neither a pension nor an insurance program and that no one has an accrued property right to benefits from the system regardless of how much that person may have contributed. FICA therefore behaves as a tax for all practical purposes, earmarked for particular uses by Congress but fully subject to Congressional authority, including redirection.

The FICA tax applies to earned income only and is not imposed on investment income such as rental income, interest, or dividends. The Hospital Insurance (HI) portion of FICA, which funds Medicare Part A hospital benefits, applies to all earned income, while the OASDI portion of the tax is imposed on earned income only up to cap annually set by Congress ($160,200 in 2023). In 2004, the Center on Budget and Policy Priorities stated that three-quarters of taxpayers pay more in payroll taxes than they do in income taxes. FICA is subject to neither the standard deduction nor any personal exemption and so is generally considered to be a regressive tax.

=== Regularly employed people ===
Since 1990, the employee's share of the Social Security portion of the FICA tax has been 6.2% of gross compensation up to a limit that adjusts with inflation. (Note: In 2011 and 2012, the employee's portion was temporarily reduced to 4.2%.) The taxation limit in 2020 was $137,700 of gross compensation, resulting in a maximum Social Security tax for 2020 of $8,537.40. This limit, known as the Social Security Wage Base, goes up each year based on average national wages and, in general, at a faster rate than the Consumer Price Index (CPI-U). The employee's share of the Medicare portion of the tax is 1.45% of wages, with no limit on the amount of wages subject to the Medicare portion of the tax. Because some payroll compensation may be subject to federal and state income tax withholding in addition to Social Security tax withholding and Medicare tax withholding, the Social Security and Medicare taxes often account for only a portion of the total an employee pays.

The employer is also liable for 6.2% Social Security and 1.45% Medicare taxes, making the total Social Security tax 12.4% of wages and the total Medicare tax 2.9%. (Self-employed people are responsible for the entire FICA percentage of 15.3% (= 12.4% + 2.9%), since they are in a sense both the employer and the employed; see the section on self-employed people for more details.)

Employee's share of the Social Security portion of the FICA tax
Year	Rate	Compensation Limit	Maximum Tax
2005	6.2%	$90,000	$5,580.00
2006	6.2%	$94,200	$5,840.40
2007	6.2%	$97,500	$6,045.00
2008	6.2%	$102,000	$6,324.00
2009	6.2%	$106,800	$6,621.60
2010	6.2%	$106,800	$6,621.60
2011	4.2%	$106,800	$4,485.60
2012	4.2%	$110,100	$4,624.20
2013	6.2%	$113,700	$7,049.40
2014	6.2%	$117,000	$7,254.00
2015	6.2%	$118,500	$7,347.00
2016	6.2%	$118,500	$7,347.00
2017	6.2%	$127,200	$7,886.40
2018	6.2%	$128,400	$7,960.80
2019	6.2%	$132,900	$8,239.80

If a worker starts a new job halfway through the year and during that year has already earned an amount exceeding the Social Security tax wage base limit with the old employer, the new employer is not allowed to stop withholding until the wage base limit has been earned with the new employer (that is, without regard to the wage base limit earned under the old employer). There are some limited cases, such as a successor-predecessor employer transfer, in which the payments that have already been withheld can be counted toward the year-to-date total.

If a worker has overpaid toward Social Security by having more than one job or by having switched jobs during the year, that worker can file a request to have that overpayment counted as a credit for tax paid when he or she files a federal income tax return. If the taxpayer is due a refund, then the FICA tax overpayment is refunded.

=== Self-employed people ===
The effective payroll tax rate based on private simulations for different income groups. Effective tax rate equals the payroll taxes paid divided by total income. Total income includes traditional measures of income, imputed undistributed corporate profits, nontaxable employee benefits, income of retirees, and nontaxable income. Payroll taxes include employee and employer FICA.

A tax similar to the FICA tax is imposed on the earnings of self-employed individuals, such as independent contractors and members of a partnership. This tax is imposed not by the Federal Insurance Contributions Act but instead by the Self-Employment Contributions Act of 1954 (SECA), which is codified as Chapter 2 of Subtitle A of the Internal Revenue Code, 26 U.S.C. § 1401 through 26 U.S.C. § 1403 (the "SE Tax Act"). Under the SE Tax Act, self-employed people are responsible for the entire percentage of 15.3% (= 12.4% [Soc. Sec.] + 2.9% [Medicare]); however, the 15.3% multiplier is applied to 92.35% of the business's net earnings from self-employment, rather than 100% of the gross earnings; the difference, 7.65%, is half of the 15.3%, and makes the calculation fair in comparison to that of regular (non-self-employed) employees.

SECA requires self-employed individuals in the United States to pay Social Security and Medicare taxes. If a self-employed individual has net earnings of $400 or more in a tax year, they are generally required to pay SECA taxes. Self-employed individuals are responsible for paying both the employer and employee portions of these taxes. However, exceptions and specific rules may apply based on the nature of self-employment and individual circumstances.

== Exemptions ==
=== Some students ===
Some student workers are exempt from FICA tax. Students enrolled at least half-time in a university and working part-time for the same university are exempted from FICA payroll taxes if and only if their relationship with the university is primarily an educational one. In order to be exempt from FICA payroll taxes, a student's work must be "incident to" the pursuit of a course of study, which is rarely the case with full-time employment. However full-time college students are never exempt from FICA taxes on work performed off-campus.

Medical residents working full-time are not considered students and are not exempt from FICA payroll taxes, according to a United States Supreme Court ruling in 2011.

A student enrolled and regularly attending classes at a school, college, or university who performs work as a cook, waiter, butler, maid, janitor, laundress, furnaceman, handyman, gardener, housekeeper, housemother, or similar duties in or around the club rooms or house of a local college club, or in or about the club rooms or house of a local chapter of a college fraternity or sorority, are exempt from FICA tax. If the location's primary purpose is to provide room or board, however, then the work is subject to FICA tax. Performing these services for an alumni club or alumni chapter also does not qualify for the exemption from FICA tax.

=== Employees of some state governments and local governments ===
A number of state and local employers and their employees in the states of Alaska, California, Colorado, Illinois, Louisiana, Maine, Massachusetts, Nevada, Ohio, and Texas are currently exempt from paying the Social Security portion of FICA taxes. They provide alternative retirement and pension plans to their employees. FICA initially did not apply to state and local governments, which were later given the option of participating. Over time, most have elected to participate, but a substantial number remain outside the system.

=== Certain payments by Native Americans, Native Americans tribal governments, and Native Americans entities ===
Payments to members of a federally recognized Native American tribe for services performed as council members are not subject to FICA.

If a member of a federally recognized Native American tribe that has recognized fishing rights or a qualified Native American entity employs another member of the same Native American tribe for a fishing rights-related activity, the wages are exempt from FICA.

=== Some nonresident aliens ===
Some nonresident aliens are exempt from FICA tax.

- Nonresident aliens who are employees of foreign governments are exempt from FICA on wages paid in their official capacities as foreign government employees.
- Nonresident aliens who are employed by a foreign employer as a crew member are exempt from FICA on wages paid for working on a foreign ship or foreign aircraft.
- Nonresident aliens who are students, scholars, professors, teachers, trainees, researchers, physicians, au pairs, or summer camp workers and are temporarily in the United States in F-1, J-1, M-1, Q-1, or Q-2 nonimmigrant status are exempt from FICA on wages paid to them for services that are allowed by their visa status and are performed to carry out the purposes the visa status.
- Nonresident aliens who are employees of international organizations are exempt from FICA on wages paid by international organizations.
- Nonresident aliens who are on an H-2A, H-2B, or H-2R visa and are residents of the Philippines are exempt from FICA on wages paid for work performed in Guam.
- Nonresident aliens who are on an H-2A visa are exempt from FICA.

=== Members of some religious groups ===
Members of certain religious groups, such as the Mennonites and the Amish, may apply to be exempt from paying FICA tax. These religious groups consider insurance to be a lack of trust in God, and see it as their religious duty to provide for members who are sick, disabled, or elderly.

In order to apply to become exempt from paying FICA tax under this provision, the person must file Form 4029, which certifies that the person:

- Waives the person's rights to all benefits under the Social Security Act;
- Is a member of a recognized religious group that is conscientiously opposed to accepting benefits under a private plan or system that makes payments in the event of death, disability, or retirement, or which makes payments towards the costs of or provides for medical care, including the benefits of any insurance system established by Social Security;
- Is a member of a religious group that makes a reasonable provision of food, shelter, and medical care for its dependent members and has done so continuously since December 31, 1950; and
- Has never received or been entitled to any benefits payable under Social Security programs.

People who claim the above exemption must agree to notify the Internal Revenue Service within 60 days of either leaving the religious group or no longer following the established teachings of the religious group.

=== Some aliens on temporary work assignment ===
When a person temporarily works outside their country of origin, the person may be covered under two different countries' social security programs for the same work. In order to relieve a person of double taxation, the certain countries and the United States have entered into tax treaties, known as totalization agreements.

Aliens whose employer sends them to the United States on a temporary work assignment may be exempt from paying FICA tax on their earnings from working in the United States if there is a totalization agreement between the United States and the worker's home country. Countries who have such a tax treaty with the United States include Australia, Austria, Belgium, Brazil, Canada, Chile, Czech Republic, Denmark, Finland, France, Germany, Greece, Hungary, Iceland, Ireland, Japan, Luxembourg, Netherlands, Norway, Poland, Portugal, Slovenia, Slovakia, South Korea, Spain, Sweden, Switzerland, United Kingdom, and Uruguay.

In order to claim an exemption from paying FICA tax, the alien worker must be on a temporary assignment of no more than five years and the alien worker must have a certificate from the country stating that the worker will continue to be covered by the country's social security system while the worker is in the United States.

=== Some family employees ===
When a parent employs a child under age 18 (or under age 21 for domestic service), payments to the child are exempt from FICA tax. The exemption also applies when a child is employed by a partnership in which each partner is a parent of the child. The exemption does not apply when the child is employed by a corporation or a partnership with partners who are not the child's parent.

=== Foreign governments and some international organizations ===
Foreign governments are exempt from FICA tax on payments to their employees. International organizations are also exempt if the organization is listed in the International Organizations Immunities Act.

If an employee is a U.S. citizen, then the employee must typically pay self-employment tax on earnings from work performed in the United States.

=== Services performed by certain individuals hired to be relieved from unemployment ===
If a state or local government pays individuals for services performed to be relieved from unemployment, the payments to the individuals are exempt from FICA tax. The services must not be performed by individuals under other types of programs. Payments are not exempt from FICA tax if the program's primary purpose is to increase an individual's chances of employment by providing training and work experience.

=== Services performed by inmates ===
Payments to inmates of a prison for services performed for the state or local government that operates the prison are exempt from FICA tax, regardless of the location where the services are performed. Services performed as part of a work-release program are exempt from FICA tax if and only if the individuals are not considered employees under common law, such as when the individual has control over what work is done and how the work it is done.

=== Services performed by patients ===
Payments to patients of an institution for services performed for the state of local government that operates the institution are exempt from FICA tax. Services performed by patients as part of an institution's rehabilitative program or therapeutic program are exempt from FICA tax.

=== Certain emergency workers ===
If a state or local government's employees were hired on a temporary basis in response to a specific unforeseen fire, storm, snow, earthquake, flood, or a similar emergency, and the employee is not intended to become a permanent employee, then payments to that employee are exempt from FICA tax. In order to qualify for the exemption from FICA tax, the employee must have been hired to work temporarily in connection with an unforeseen emergency, such as an individual temporarily hired to battle a major forest fire, to respond to a volcano eruption, or to help people affected by a severe earthquake or flood. Regular long-term police employees and regular long-term fire employees do not qualify under this particular exemption from FICA tax.

=== Certain newspaper carriers ===
Payments to newspaper carriers under age 18 are exempt from FICA tax.

=== Some real estate agents and salespeople ===
Compensation for real estate agents and salespeople is exempt from FICA tax under certain circumstances. The compensation is exempt if substantially all compensation is directly related to sales or other output, rather than to the number of hours worked, and there is a written contract stating that the individuals will not be treated as employees for federal tax purposes. The individual must typically pay self-employment tax on the compensation.

== History ==
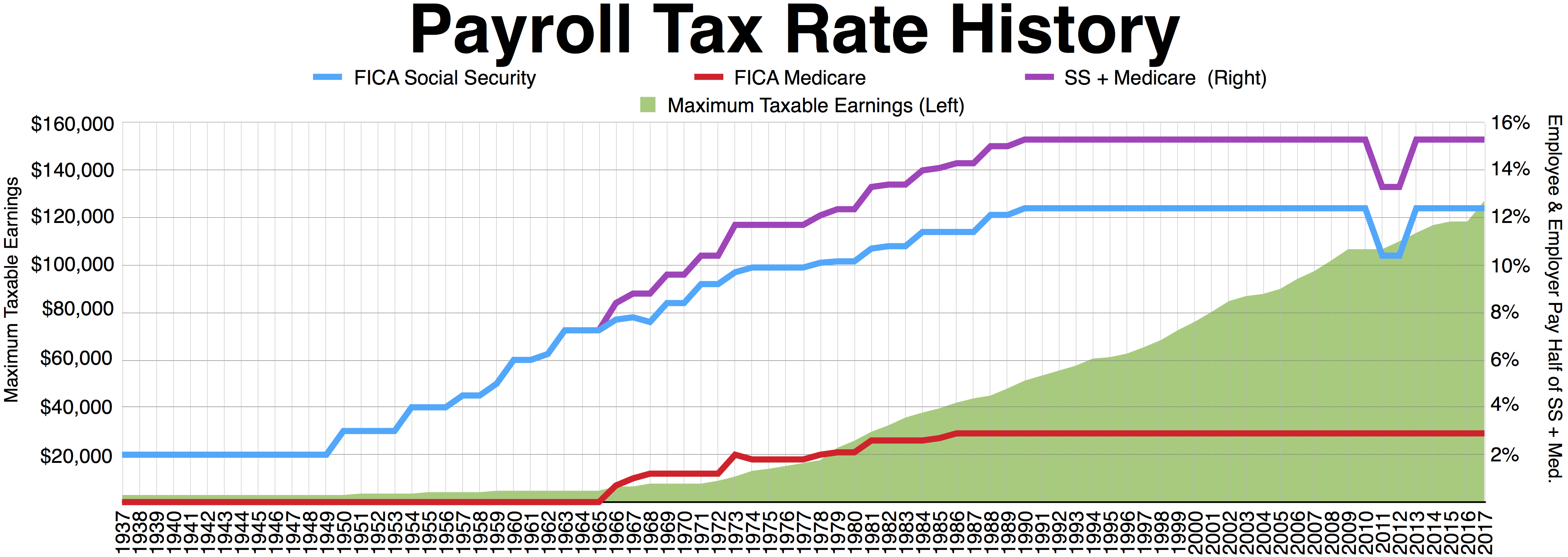
Payroll tax rates history

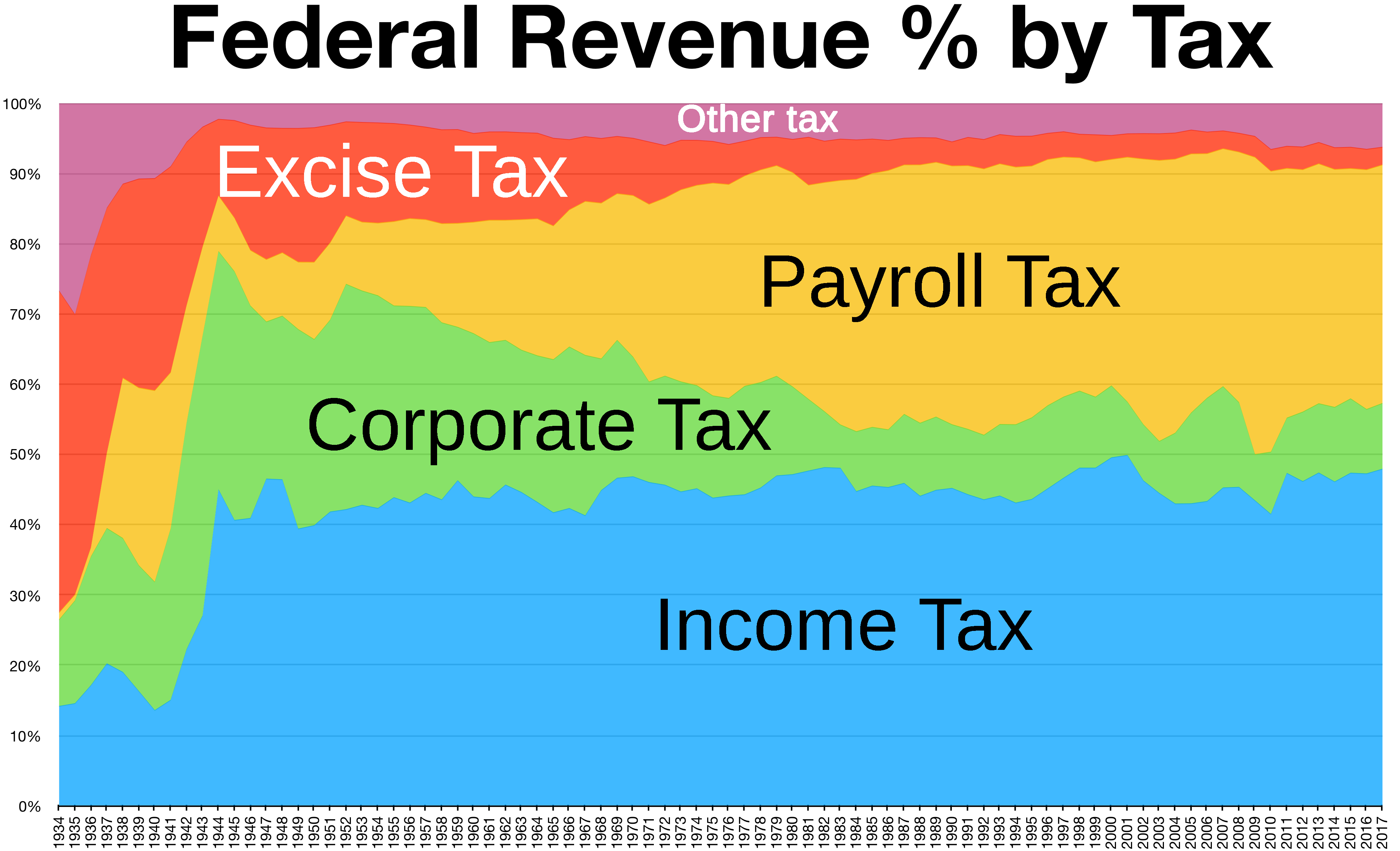
Taxes revenue by source chart history

Prior to the Great Depression, the following presented difficulties for Americans:

- The U.S. had no federally mandated retirement savings; consequently, for those people who had not voluntarily saved money throughout their working lives, the end of their work careers was the end of all income.
- Similarly, the U.S. had no federally mandated disability income insurance to provide for citizens disabled by injuries (of any kind—non-work-related); consequently, for most people, a disabling injury meant no more income (since most people have little to no income except earned income from work).
- In addition, there was no federally mandated disability income insurance to provide for people unable to ever work during their lives, such as anyone born with severe intellectual disability.
- Further, the U.S. had no federally mandated health insurance for the elderly; consequently, for many people, the end of their work careers was the end of their ability to pay for medical care.

In the 1930s, the New Deal introduced Social Security to rectify the first three problems (retirement, injury-induced disability, or congenital disability). It introduced the FICA tax as the means to pay for Social Security.

In the 1960s, Medicare was introduced to rectify the fourth problem (health care for the elderly). The FICA tax was increased in order to pay for this expense.

In December 2010, as part of the legislation that extended the Bush tax cuts (called the Tax Relief, Unemployment Insurance Reauthorization, and Job Creation Act of 2010), the government negotiated a temporary, one-year reduction in the FICA payroll tax. In February 2012, the tax cut was extended for another year.

Under FICA, the payroll tax applies to "wages" (defined by the act as "remuneration for employment"). In 2014, the Supreme Court unanimously held in United States v. Quality Stores, Inc. that severance pay is taxable wages for FICA purposes.

In August 2020, President Donald Trump signed an executive order to temporarily suspend collection of the tax from September to December 2020. Critics feared this would lead to more underfunding of the Social Security Trust Fund and Medicare trust fund.

== Criticism ==
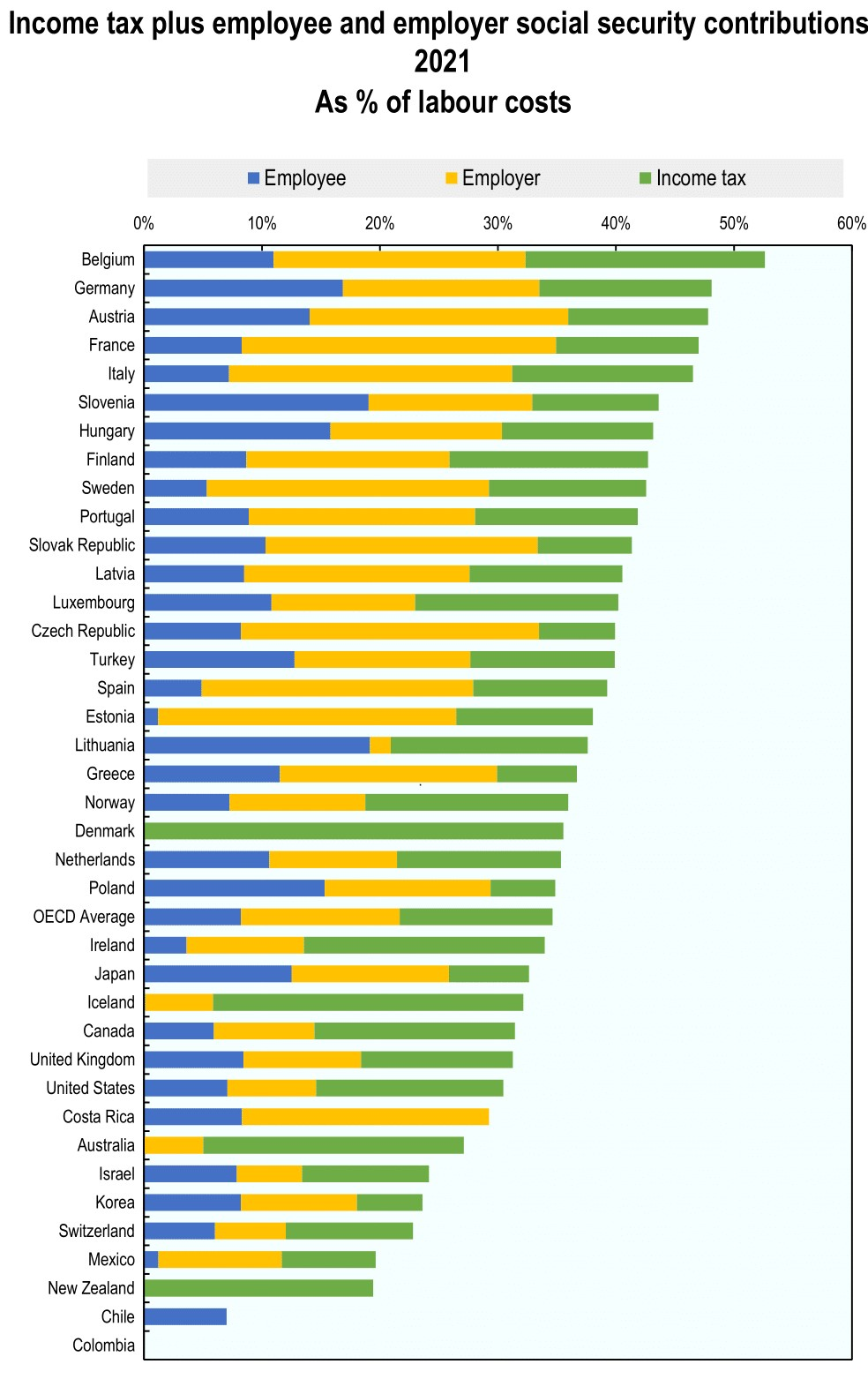
Payroll and income tax by country

The Social Security component of the FICA tax is regressive. That is, the effective tax rate regresses, or decreases, as income increases beyond the compensation limit or wage base limit amount. The Social Security component is a flat tax for wage levels under the Social Security Wage Base (see "Regular" employees above). Because no tax is owed on wages above the wage base limit amount, the total tax rate declines as wages increase beyond that limit. In other words, for wage levels above the limit, the absolute dollar amount of tax owed remains constant.

The earnings above the wage base limit amount are not, however, taken into account in the Primary Insurance Amount (PIA) to determine benefits payable under the various insurance programs of social security.

The FICA tax also is not imposed on unearned income, including interest on savings deposits, stock dividends, and capital gains such as profits from the sale of stock or real estate. The proportion of total income that is exempt from FICA tax as "unearned income" tends to rise with higher income brackets.

Some, including Third Way, argue that since Social Security taxes are eventually returned to taxpayers, with interest, in the form of Social Security benefits, the regressiveness of the tax is effectively negated. That is, the taxpayer gets back (more or less) what they put into the Social Security system. Others, including The Economist and the Congressional Budget Office, point out that the Social Security system as a whole is progressive in the lower income brackets. Individuals with lower lifetime average wages receive a larger benefit (as both a percentage of their lifetime average wage income and a percentage of Social Security taxes paid) than do individuals with higher lifetime average wages; but for some lower earners, shorter lifetimes may negate the benefits.

== See also ==
- Cafeteria plan
- FICO, a similar initialism sometimes confused with FICA
- Form W-2
- Income tax
- Medicare (United States)
- National Insurance contribution (NIC), a somewhat similar tax in the United Kingdom
- Social Security (United States)
- Trust Fund Recovery Penalty, the personal liability of employers who fail to pay the tax
