= Great British Class Survey =

2013 survey of social class in the United Kingdom

The Great British Class Survey (GBCS) was a survey of social class in the United Kingdom conducted in 2011. The survey was developed in collaboration with academics from the University of Manchester, the London School of Economics and Political Science, and the University of York. The research has been published in the journal Sociology. The findings are also described in a book, Social Class in the 21st Century, by Mike Savage, Niall Cunningham, Fiona Devine, Sam Friedman, Daniel Laurison, Lisa Mckenzie, Andrew Miles, Helene Snee and Paul Wakeling. The results released were based on a survey of 325,000 adults, 160,000 residents of Britain most of whom lived in England and described themselves as "white." Class as a multi-dimensional construct was defined and measured according to the amount and kind of economic, cultural, and social capital reported. Economic capital was defined as income and assets; cultural capital as amount and type of cultural interests and activities, and social capital as the quantity and social status of their friends, family and personal and business contacts. This theoretical framework was developed by Pierre Bourdieu who first published his theory of social distinction in 1979.

== Survey ==
To determine cultural capital, questions were asked about leisure activities and interests; taste in music; how media was consumed; and taste in food in a manner similar to that used in the Cultural Capital and Social Exclusion survey. Two cultural scores were developed, one for "high brow" culture, preference for interests such as classical music, historic architecture, museums, art galleries, jazz, theatre and French restaurants; and the other for "emergent culture," appreciation and participation in such activities as video games, social networking, sports, hanging out with friends, working out at the gym, and rap or rock concerts. Social capital was measured using the position generator originated by Nan Lin, an American sociologist, in 2001 which measures the range of social connections. People were asked if they knew anyone in several dozen occupations. Social capital scores were computed using the mean of the status scores of contacts on the Cambridge Social Interaction and Stratification (CAMSIS) scale. Economic capital was determined by asking about household income, amount and type of savings, and ownership of property. Questions were included about composition of households, amount and type of education, social mobility, and political attitude.

The survey was offered to visitors to the BBC Lab UK website between January 2011 and July 2011; however, the 160,000 responses received after close examination it was made obvious that the web survey suffered from a strong selection bias with respondents being predominantly drawn from the well-educated social groups. The term used for these results were that of a 'typical BBC news audience.' To address this problem, the BBC therefore agreed to conduct a separate, nationally representative face-to-face survey using identical questions. This survey, with 1026 respondents, was conducted using quota sampling methods by the well-known survey firm GfK in April 2011. Tests from its field division and by ourselves indicate that its demographics are nationally representative.

== Results ==
Analysis of the survey revealed seven classes: a wealthy "elite"; a prosperous salaried "middle class" consisting of professionals and managers; a class of technical experts; a class of ‘new affluent’ workers, and at the lower levels of the class structure, in addition to an ageing traditional working class, a ‘precariat' characterised by very low levels of capital and lasting precarious economic security, and a group of emergent service workers. The fracturing of the middle sectors of the social structure into distinguishable factions separated by generational, economic, cultural, and social characteristics was considered notable by the authors of the research.

=== Elite ===
Members of the elite class are the top six percent of British society with very high economic capital (particularly savings), high social capital, and very high highbrow cultural capital. Occupations such as chief executive officers, IT and telecommunications directors, marketing and sales directors; functional managers and directors, judges, lawyers (barristers and solicitors), accountants, financial managers, doctors, dentists, Pharmacists, professors and advertising and public relations directors were strongly represented. Also, many gained economic capital through trust funds and inheritances.

Average household income of elite households in 2011 was £89,000; average house price was £325,000 and above. Few are ethnic minorities; many are graduates, and over half come from families who were also in the elite class. Graduates of elite universities are over-represented, in particular from Oxford, Cambridge, King's College London, University College London, the London School of Economics, Durham University, the University of Edinburgh, the University of Bristol, Imperial College London and City University of London. The survey also indicated graduates from London South Bank University, not usually considered an elite university, were over represented, in part due to its location. Trinity College Dublin, The University of Edinburgh, St Andrews and Durham are the only universities located outside the south of England. Elite households are primarily located within London and the Home Counties.

=== Established middle class ===
Members of the established middle class, about 25 percent of British society, reported high economic capital, high status of mean social contacts, and both highbrow and high emerging cultural capital. Well-represented occupations included electrical engineers, occupational therapists, midwives, environmental professionals, police constables, quality assurance and regulatory professionals, town-planning officials, and special-needs teaching professionals.

As of 2011 the established middle class had an average household income of £47,000 a year and owned a home worth an average of £177,000 with average savings of £26,000. Many were graduates, and a majority of their members work in the professions or management. Many originated from professional and managerial families. There are some ethnic minorities. They engage in a wide variety of occupations but many are professionals in public service or hold managerial jobs. They live throughout Britain, many outside large towns or conurbations. They can be fairly described as "comfortably off, secure, and established."

=== Technical middle class ===
The technical middle class, about 6 percent of British society, shows high economic capital, but relatively few contacts reported, and moderate cultural capital. Occupations represented include medical radiographers, aircraft pilots, natural and social science professionals and physical scientists, senior professionals in education establishments, and business, research, and administrative positions.

The technical middle class is relatively well to do, with an average household incomes of £37,000, average savings of £66,000 and houses worth an average of £163,000. Members of the class report the lowest number of social contacts of any of the classes, though these do tend to be high status, probably mostly other professional experts. It is relatively culturally disengaged with both highbrow and emerging culture. Women comprise about 59 percent of this class. Many of technical middle class do research or scientific and technical work; a portion of the graduates are from established and prestigious universities with strong reputations for science, such as University of Birmingham, University of Warwick, University of Cambridge, University College London, University of Southampton, and Imperial College London with degrees in science and technology. Many of the technical middle class live in South East England where scientific and technical jobs are to be found. If they live in an urban area they live in the suburbs. Many of them have middle-class origins but are less engaged socially and culturally with the arts and humanities.

=== New affluent workers ===
New affluent workers, about 15 percent of British society, show moderately good economic capital, relatively poor status of social contacts, though highly varied, and moderate highbrow but good emerging cultural capital. Occupations include electricians and electrical fitters; postal workers; retail cashiers and checkout operatives; plumbers and heating and ventilation engineers; sales and retail assistants; housing officers; kitchen and catering assistants; quality assurance technicians.

New affluent workers score high on 'emerging' cultural capital, but low on highbrow cultural capital. Established forms of cultural capital seem to be shunned. Average household income is moderate; average savings is small with average house value of £129,000 as of 2011. It is economically secure without being very well off. Members have many social contacts, though the status scores tend to be moderate. Overall, this class scores moderately well on all three capitals, with a particular penchant for emerging cultural capital. They are socially and culturally active and relatively prosperous. They tend to come from non-middle-class families, and few have been to university. 57 per cent are men. Those who are graduates attended universities such as Liverpool Hope, University of Bolton, or the University of West England. Many are young people in white collar and blue collar jobs in the private sector and in customer facing occupations. They live throughout Britain, many in old manufacturing centres.

=== Traditional working class ===
The traditional working class, about 14 percent of British society, shows relatively poor economic capital, but some housing assets, few social contacts, and low highbrow and emerging cultural capital. Typical occupations include electrical and electronics technicians; care workers; cleaners; van drivers; electricians; residential, day, and domiciliary care.

The traditional working class with a mean household income of only £13,000. However, many own their homes, with an average value in 2011 of £127,000, but only modest savings. Social contacts are low and the status of contacts are moderate. Scores on highbrow cultural capital are moderate, and scores on emerging cultural capital are particularly low. The traditional working class scores low on nearly every measure of capital. Few are graduates, many filling traditional working-class occupations such as lorry drivers, cleaners, electrician and menial white collar occupations. Many are women. Those who seek higher education tend to seek it in institutions which recruit mature or part-time students such as Open University. Many live in old industrial areas of England outside South East England and in Scotland, Wales and Northern Ireland. They often represent an older generation and earlier historical period.

=== Emergent service sector ===
The emergent service sector, about 19 percent of British society, shows relatively poor economic capital, but reasonable household income, moderate social contacts, high emerging (but low highbrow) cultural capital. Typical occupations include bar staff, chefs, nursing auxiliaries and assistants, assemblers and routine operatives, care workers, elementary storage occupations, customer service occupations, musicians.

The emergent service sector as of 2011 had an average household income of £21,000. It has little savings and is likely to rent. They have a significant number of social contacts, who tend to have moderate social status. The emerging cultural capital is higher for this class than for any other class, indicating a high degree of cultural engagement in youthful musical, sporting and internet activities, but highbrow cultural capital is low. Despite being marginal in terms of its economic capital, its social and cultural capital is high. Emergent service sector workers are relatively young with an average age of 34. Many are ethnic minorities. Few are graduates or come from middle-class families but are culturally engaged with emerging cultural capital. Typical occupations are bar work, chef, customer service occupations and call centre workers. They fill a wide variety of low-paid service sector slots. Some are graduates, some of whom have engaged in work in the arts and humanities at universities such as Goldsmiths, University of York, Birkbeck and SOAS. Many live in inexpensive urban neighborhoods including the centre of London and in university towns such as Aberystwyth or York.

=== Precariat ===
The precariat, about 15 percent of British society, shows poor economic capital, and the lowest scores on every other criterion. Typical occupations include cleaners, van drivers, care workers, carpenters and joiners, caretakers, leisure and travel service occupations, shopkeepers and proprietors, and retail cashiers. The precariat is the poorest class with an average household income of £8,000, negligible savings, who usually rent. Their social contacts are few and of low status. Interest in either highbrow or emerging cultural capital is low. They often live in old industrial areas but away from large urban areas; Stoke-on-Trent is a typical location. Few have attended university.

Precariat is a term used by the British economist Guy Standing who has analysed the precariat as a new emerging social class in work done for the think tank Policy Network and in his subsequent book Precariat: The New Dangerous Class and as a reflection on the existence of a significant group characterised by high amounts of insecurity on all of measures of capital.
