= Kevin Ward (geographer) =

British geographer and academic

Kevin Ward is a British geographer and academic. Since 2007, he has been Professor of Human Geography at the University of Manchester.

== Education and career ==
Ward graduated from Middlesex University with a BA in economics and geography in 1991. The following year, he completed an MA in transport economics at the University of Leeds. He was awarded a second MA (in social research methods) by the University of Manchester in 1995, where he also carried out doctoral studies supported by an ESRC studentship; his PhD was awarded in 1998.

Between 1992 and 1994, Ward was a research assistant at the University of Birmingham's Department of Economics. From 1997 to 2000, he was a research associate at the University of Manchester, where he was appointed Lecturer in Human Geography in 2000. He was promoted to a senior lectureship in 2003 and to a readership in 2005, before being appointed Professor of Human Geography in 2007.

== Publications ==
- (Co-authored with Huw Beynon, Damian Grimshaw, and Jill Rubery) Managing Employment Change: The Realities of Working in Britain (Oxford University Press, 2002).
- (Co-authored with Mike Savage and Alan Warde) Urban Sociology, Modernity and Capitalism (Sage, 2002).
- (Edited with Jamie Peck) City of Revolution: Restructuring Manchester (Manchester University Press, 2002).
- (Co-authored with Noel Castree, Neil M. Coe, and Michael Samers), Spaces of Work: Global Capitalism and the Geographies of Labour (Sage, 2004).
- (Edited with Kim England) Neoliberalization: States, Networks, Peoples (Wiley, 2007).
- Researching the City: A Guide for Students (Sage, 2012).
