= Alan Warde =

British sociologist and academic

Alan Warde, FBA, FAcSS (born 18 August 1949) is a British sociologist and academic. He has been Professor of Sociology at the University of Manchester since 1999.

== Education and career ==
Born in 1949, Warde was educated at Downing College, Cambridge, graduating with a BA in 1971. He then completed an MA at Durham University and carried out doctoral studies at the University of Leeds; his PhD was awarded in 1976 for his thesis "Ideology, strategy and intra-party division in the British Labour Party, 1956-74".

Warde was appointed to a lectureship at Lancaster University in 1978 and was promoted to a readership there in 1994, before becoming a full professor in 1996. In 1999, he was appointed Professor of Sociology at the University of Manchester.

== Honours and awards ==
In 2018, Warde was elected a Fellow of the British Academy, the United Kingdom's national academy for the humanities and social sciences. In 2011, he had also been elected a Fellow of the Academy of Social Sciences.

== Publications ==
- Consensus and Beyond: The Development of Labour Party Strategy since the Second World War (Manchester University Press, 1982).
- (Co-authored with Nicholas Abercrombie) Social Change in Contemporary Britain (Polity, 1992).
- (Co-authored with Nicholas Abercrombie) Stratification and Social Inequality: Studies in British Society (Framework, 1994).
- (Co-authored with Nicholas Abercrombie) Family, Household and the Life-Course: Studies in British Society (Framework, 1994).
- (Co-authored with Mike Savage) Urban Sociology, Capitalism and Modernity (Palgrave, 1993; 2nd ed. with Kevin Ward, 2002).
- (Co-authored with Stephen Edgell and Kevin Hetherington) Consumption Matters: The Production and Experience of Consumption (Wiley, 1996).
- Consumption, Food and Taste: Culinary Antimonies and Commodity Culture (Sage, 1997).
- (Co-authored with Lydia Martens) Eating Out: Social Differentiation, Consumption and Pleasure (Cambridge University Press, 2000).
- (Edited with Nicholas Abercrombie, Rosemary Deem, Sue Penna, Keith Soothill, Andrew Sayer, John Urry and Sylvia Walby) Contemporary British Society: A New Introduction to Sociology (Polity, 2000).
- (Edited with Jukka Gronow) Ordinary Consumption (Routledge, 2001).
- (Edited with Nicholas Abercrombie) The Contemporary British Society Reader (Polity, 2001).
- (Edited with Stan Metcalfe) Market Relations and the Competitive Process (Manchester University Press, 2002).
- (Edited with Mark Harvey and Andrew Mcmeekin) Qualities of Food (Manchester University Press, 2004).
- (Co-authored with Unni Kjaernes and Mark Harvey) Trust in Food: An Institutional and Comparative Analysis (Palgrave Macmillan, 2007).
- (Co-authored with Tony Bennett, Mike Savage, Elizabeth Silva, Modesto Gayo-Cal and David Wright) Culture, Class, Distinction (Routledge, 2009).
- The Practice of Eating (Polity, 2016).
- Consumption: A Sociological Analysis (Palgrave Macmillan, 2017).
