= Susumu Nishibe =

Japanese critic, conservative, and economist (1939–2018)

- 西部 邁
- Born: March 15, 1939; Oshamambe, Yamakoshi District, Yamayoshi, Hokkaido, Japan
- Died: January 21, 2018 (aged 78); Ōta, Tokyo, Tokyo, Japan

Academic background
- Education: Sapporo Minami High School
- Alma mater: University of Tokyo (Bachelor, Master)
- Influences: Edmund Burke, Joseph Schumpeter, Yukichi Fukuzawa, José Ortega y Gasset, Tsuneari Fukuda

Academic work
- Discipline: Socioeconomics, Political philosophy, Mass society Studies
- School or tradition: Neoconservative
- Influenced: Shinzo Abe, Shoji Nishida, Keishi Saeki, Satoshi Fujii, Takeshi Nakano, Teruhisa Se, Kenji Sato, Keita Shibayama

Susumu Nishibe (西部 邁; 15 March 1939 – 21 January 2018) was a Japanese critic, conservative and economist. He was a professor of Socioeconomics at University of Tokyo. He criticized modern economics, progressivism, and rationalism, and advocated theories on mass society, conservatism, and the independence of Japan from the United States.

== Early life and education ==
Susumu Nishibe was born on 15 March 1939 in Oshamambe, Hokkaido. His father was a son of a Buddhist monk in Naganuma, Hokkaido.

After graduating from Sapporo Minami High, he attended the University of Tokyo in 1958, where he practiced far left student activism as a member of the Communist League (共産主義者同盟, abbreviated as "Bunto" from a German word "bund") and also participated in the Anpo Protests (安保闘争), however he broke with the left in 1961.

Then he majored in theoretical economics under Motō Kaji (かじ もとお、嘉治 元郎) and got a Doctor of Economics from the University of Tokyo. It was at the suggestion of Masahiko Aoki that he went to the graduate school.

== Academic career ==
After that, he was successively an assistant professor at the Faculty of Economics, Yokohama National University and the College of Arts and Science, of the University of Tokyo.

In 1975, he published his first book, "Socio-Economics" (ソシオ・エコノミックス, Soshio Ekonomikkusu), in which he criticized modern economics by introducing the methodology of sociology and other disciplines. After that, he moved to the United States to study at the UC Berkeley and then at Cambridge. In 1979, his experience note "Into the mirage" (蜃気楼の中へ, Shinkirou no nakae) was published. After returning to Japan, he began to criticize advanced mass society and Americanism, and defend Western conservative thoughts as a conservative critic since the 1980s. In 1986, he was appointed a professor of Socio-Economics at the College of Arts and Science of University of Tokyo. He also taught as a visiting professor at The Open University of Japan.

== Death ==
Nishibe died of suicide on 21 January 2018. It was suspected that the suicide was assisted.

== See also ==
- Fukuzawa Yukichi
- Nakae Chōmin
- Nakano Takeshi
- Natsume Sōseki
- Saeki Keishi
- Tsuneari Fukuda
- Yamamoto Tsunetomo
