= Beverley Skeggs =

British sociologist

- Born: Middlesbrough, North Yorkshire, England
- Occupation: Sociologist

Academic background
- Education: University of York; Keele University

Academic work
- Discipline: Sociologist
- Main interests: Class, Gender, Value(s)

Beverley Skeggs is a British sociologist, She was Distinguished Professor of Sociology at Lancaster University from 2019 until she retired in 2023, where she directed the Centre for Alternatives to Social and Economic Inequality, and has been Emeritus Professor there since 2023.

== Life and career ==
Skeggs was born in Middlesbrough, a post-industrial town on the south bank of the River Tees in Teeside. She studied for an undergraduate degree in sociology at the University of York (BA) and went on to study further at Keele University, where she obtained a PGCE and PhD.

=== Career history ===
As a sociologist she worked at Crewe and Alsager College of Higher Education (Research Fellow), Worcester College of Higher Education, University of York. From 1996 to 1999, she was a Director of Women's Studies at Lancaster University (with Celia Lury). In 1999, she was appointed to a chair in Sociology at the University of Manchester, where she was Head of department from 2001 to 2004. From 2004 to 2017 she was a professor of sociology at Goldsmiths, University of London, as Head of department from 2010 to 2013 and from 2013 to 2016 held an ESRC Professorial Fellowship. From 2017-2019 she was the Academic Director of the Atlantic Fellows Programme, and also led the Global Economies of Care theme in the International Inequalities Institute at the London School of Economics (LSE).

During 2007, she was the Kerstin Hesselgren Professor in Gender Studies at Stockholm University. In 2003, she was elected as an Academician of the Academy of the Learned Societies for the Social Sciences. Professor Skeggs was an honorary professor at the University of Warwick, and has received honorary doctorates from Stockholm University, Aalborg University and the University of Teesside (her hometown). In June 2019, she received an honorary doctorate from the University of Joensuu, Eastern Finland.

==== Journal editing ====
She was joint managing editor of the journal The Sociological Review from 2011 to 2016 and its European editor at large from 2016 to 2022. In 2015, with Mike Savage (LSE), Skeggs established The Sociological Review Foundation as a charity to support interdisciplinary social science, especially early-career researchers. She was its chief executive from 2016 to 2020 and a trustee from 2015 to 2025.

== Key studies ==
=== Formations of Class and Gender: Becoming Respectable (1997) ===
Beverley Skeggs is the author of the influential study Formations of Class and Gender: Becoming Respectable (1997), a longitudinal ethnography of subjectivity across the lives of women as they move from 'caring courses' to work and family, into sexuality and how they negotiate living class in the UK. Formations was translated into Swedish as: Att Bli Respektabel (2000), Stockholm: Diadalos. Translated into French as Des Femmes Respectables; Class et Genre en Milieu Populaire (2015) (translated by Marie-Pierre Pouly, Preface by Anne-Marie Devereux. The understandings of class in Formations were developed in Class, Self, Culture (2004), which critiques the idea of the self and explores the different ways class circulates as a form of value as it attaches to different bodies. Examining the production of values across a range of different sites, such as the IMF, popular culture and academic theory, it puts to the test sociological theories which suggest that class is in decline. Class, Self, Culture was translated into Finnish (2013) as Elävä luokka by Anu-Hanna Anttila, Lauri Lahikainen and Mikko Jakonen, Helsinki: Vastapaino Press. Skeggs' understanding of how the self is classed is developed through engagement with the works of Pierre Bourdieu. In Feminism After Bourdieu, co-edited with Lisa Adkins, feminists address Bourdieu's ideas on reflexivity, emotional capital, the self and the social and their relation to gender. Skeggs explores affect and the self alongside an introduction to Bourdieu.

Her methodological approach was first elaborated in Feminist Cultural Theory: Production and Process (1995), an edited collection that brings together feminists from across disciplines (literature, film, design, media, law, sociology) to discuss how they went about producing their classic texts in cultural studies.

In 1998 at Lancaster University, a group of feminists (of which Beverley Skeggs was a part) organised an international conference on feminist theory. The resulting book Transformations: Thinking Through Feminism (edited with Sara Ahmed, Celia Lury, Jane Kilby and Maureen McNeil) includes chapters by Lauren Berlant, Gayatri Spivak, Donna Haraway, Elspeth Probyn and Vikki Bell. The conference also spawned Routledge's "Transformations" series, which includes a wide range of volumes on feminist theory, including the works of Kirsten Campbell, Breda Grey, Ann Cronin and Steph Lawler.

A large-scale government funded ESRC (Economic and Social Research Council) research project with Professor Leslie Moran, Paul Tyrer and Karen Corteen examined the sustainability and experience of gay space, resulting in the book Sexuality and the Politics of Violence and Safety. The book explores how violence can be used as a resource in political claims-making. It also brings together innovative multi-methods, including a census space survey and citizen's inquiries, alongside traditional interviews and focus groups. The idea of gender and sexuality as resources that can be deployed, fixed or attached is developed in the article 'Uneasy Alignments, Resourcing Respectable Subjectivity'. Numerous publications were generated from the sexuality project.

=== Making Class and Self through Televised Ethical Scenarios 2005–2008 ===
Another large ESRC research project was conducted by Skeggs (with Helen Wood, Leicester University and Nancy Thumin, Leeds University) between 2005 and 2008 on the making of a moral economy through reality TV, Making Class and Self through Televised Ethical Scenarios. This project brings together many of the threads already apparent in Professor Skeggs' research, including the making of the exchange-value self, the emphasis that is placed on performing and telling one's self as a source of value and the class and race based challenges that are made through the construction of an alternative moral value system. This research project was part of a much larger research programme, 'Identities,' an ESRC £7million investigation into identity construction in contemporary Britain. Professor Skeggs delivered one of the inaugural lectures for the programme.

A significant methodological contribution was made by this project, which by using a multi-method approach that combined textual analysis with audience research developed the 'affective textual encounter' for studying audience responses. This method showed how class, gender and race relations are made in the research encounter when women authorize their own speech through recourse to cultural resources such as 'taste' and maternal authority (this is developed in their article on method in the 2008 European Journal of Cultural Studies and the ESRC research report). The research participant's authorization of particular moral economies was closely related to their positions in circuits of value, positions which cut through, disturb and constitute gender, race and class. It has been published as 'Reacting to Reality TV; Audience, Performance and Value'(with Helen Wood). The research also led to an international edited collection on 'Reality Television and Class' (also with Helen Wood) published by BFI/Palgrave. Numerous articles have been published on this project. Her most recent work consolidates the prior analysis of the relationship between value and values, leading to the development of ideas about the moral economy of person production. She developed the idea of 'person value' following a critique of Bourdieu and an exploration of how ideology is produced through "value struggles".

=== Values and Value 2013–2017 ===
In September 2013, Skeggs began an ESRC Professorial Fellowship on "A Sociology of Values and Value". You can hear her discuss her introductory framework for the British Journal of Sociology annual lecture. The ESRC Values and Value project began as a study of what happens when economic value is accumulated from spheres previously considered non-economic such as social network platforms and prosperity theology. For instance, Facebook makes considerable economic gain from commodifying friendship through the algorithmic conversion of "likes" into advertising sales. Does this process reconfigure the value/s of friendship? What happens to values such as loyalty and care in this conversion? Do friends capitalize upon their own value? Using software designed by Dr Simon Yuill, this research installed a plug in on volunteers' browsers to collect all data over six months. It found that Facebook constantly tracks people whether they are on the Facebook platform or not. Digital friendliness is conducted through rhythms of interaction driven by algorithms. These algorithms artificially stimulate the intensity of exchange with "people of influence", that is you are more likely to be connected to those on your newsfeed who have power and influence than those who have none. However, with prosperity theology research, conducted through ethnography, the project found that prosperity theology doesn't just connect people into the faith of money but also provides a social service for marginalized communities. Research papers include: The methodology of a multi-model project examining how Facebook infrastructures social relations. And Capital experimentation with person/a formation: how Facebook's monetization refigures the relationship between property, personhood and protest. In this project software is used alongside quantitative and qualitative methods to investigate the digital production of new forms of inequality. See presentation for the Helsinki Anthropology/SR "Knots" conference "A new regime of accumulation? Tying in and tying up, tracking relations on Facebook". The final symposium of the conference is available on the Sociological Review website.

== Further contributions ==
In 2016, (with Mike Savage, Sociology, LSE) Beverley Skeggs established The Sociological Review Foundation as a charity and community organisation to support interdisciplinary social science activities, especially support for ECR's: see. The charity operates alongside the UK's oldest sociological journal.

Skeggs has been debating issues of class throughout her career. She edited a special issue on "Sociologies of Class: Elites (GBCS) and Critiques" (2015), with an introduction on "Stratification or exploitation, domination, dispossession and devaluation?" This developed from her critique of the GBCS on BBC Radio 4's "Thinking Allowed". And her response to Mike Savage's inaugural lecture at the LSE on "The Old New Politics of Class". At the International Sociological Association conference in 2015 she responded to Michael Burawoy in a debate about Gramsci and Bourdieu, "Roots of domination".

=== Public interventions ===
Skeggs can be heard reflecting on the analysis of her Formations of Class and Gender; Becoming Respectable book. An interview about the reality television research can be heard on BBC Radio 4's Thinking Allowed. Julie Burchill interviewed Skeggs for the Sky TV programmes Chavs (2005) and Girl Power (2007) (see YouTube). She has also appeared in contributions to popular debates, such as the 1998 Channel 4 TV programme on 'Things to Come', exploring (with a comic twist) the future role of women. The BBC's Thinking Allowed radio programme covered her work in 2003, 2008 and where she has also discussed 'class and Christmas', 'cruel optimism', 'moral economies' and 'everyday life' (with Les Back in 2016. She was a judge for the BSA/BBC Radio 4 ethnography prize in 2015. A Guide to the Modern Snob, BBC Radio 4 (2016) features Skeggs, as does Objects of Desire, BBC Radio 4 (2016), where Matthew Sweet explores how the things people accumulate say more than expected about who they are.

Skeggs joined a panel presentation as part of the Former West Public Editorial Meeting (2015) on Who is a "People?" Constructions of the "We" for formerwest.org/. In a day devoted to "Following in the Tracks of Richard Hoggart", she gave a presentation of the significant connections between Hoggart and other ethnographic work on class. Beverley Skeggs gave a keynote lecture at the Pits and Perverts Revisited event @ Law Department, Birkbeck. 2015. In 2016 she engaged in a public debate with Lenny Henry, Pat Younge and Dawn Foster on "A Future for Public Service Television: Content and Platforms in a Digital World". "Are You Being Heard? Representing Britain on TV for the public inquiries into the future of public TV. See Are You Being Heard? Transcript, 22 March 2016. See also #FutureofTV @Tvinquiry

== Key publications ==
- The Media (Issues in Sociology) (with John Mundy) (1992), Thomas Nelson (ISBN 9780174384465)
- Feminist Cultural Theory: Production and Process (1995) (ed.), Manchester: Manchester University Press
- Formations of Class and Gender: Becoming Respectable (1997), London: Sage (ISBN 9780761955122)
- Transformations: Thinking through Feminism (ed. with Sara Ahmed, Jane Kilby, Celia Lury and Maureen McNeil) (2000), Routledge (ISBN 978-0-415-22066-8)
- Class, Self, Culture (2004), London: Routledge (ISBN 978-0-415-30085-8)
- Sexuality and the Politics of Violence and Safety (with Leslie Moran) (2003), London: Routledge (ISBN 978-0-415-30091-9)
- Feminism after Bourdieu (with Lisa Adkins) (2005) Oxford. Wiley-Blackwell (Sociological Review Series) (ISBN 978-1-4051-2395-2)
- The Politics of Imagination: Keeping Open, Curious and Critical, with Joanna Latimer, Special Issue of Sociological Review (2011) August 59,3.
- Reality Television and Class ed. with Helen Wood (includes 17 chapters). London: BFI/Palgrave (2011) (ISBN 978-1-84457-3-97-4)
- Reacting to Reality Television: Audience, Performance and Value (co-authored with Helen Wood) London: Routledge (2012) (ISBN 978-0-415-69371-4)

Publications on Beverley Skeggs

- Thinking with Beverley Skeggs (edited by Annika Olsson) Stockholm: Stockholm University Press (2008) (ISBN 91-87792-41-9), pp. 105.
- Arvostus ja vastarinta (an interview with Beverley Skeggs) Aivojen yhteistyön muistivihkot. Helsinki. Translated Mikko Jakonen. (978-952-92-4508-6). pp. 40 (http://www.megafoni.org)
- Interview on Respectability and Resistance with Beverley Skeggs (2006)
- "Tornhill, Sophie and Tollin, Katharina 'On the economy of Moralism and Working-class Properness: An interview with Beverley Skeggs about Feminism, Respectability and Use-Value'", in Fronesis: a Journal of Marxism and Feminism (2008) pp. 25–26. Also in Eurozine
