= Nicholas Abercrombie =

British sociologist and retired academic

Nicholas Abercrombie (born 1944) is a British sociologist and retired academic. He was Professor of Sociology at Lancaster University from 1990 to 2004.

== Education and career ==
Born in Birmingham in 1944, Abercrombie's father Michael and mother Jane (née Johnson) were academics. He was educated at The Queen's College, Oxford, graduating with a BA in 1966. He then completed an MSc at the London School of Economics in 1968.

Abercrombie worked as a research officer in town planning at University College London from 1968 to 1970, when he joined Lancaster University as a lecturer. He then carried out doctoral studies there and obtained a PhD in 1980. In 1983, he was promoted to a senior lectureship and in 1988 became reader in sociology. In 1990, he was appointed Professor of Sociology at Lancaster, and in 1995 became Pro-Vice Chancellor. He retired in 2004.

== Publications ==
- Class, Structure, and Knowledge (Basil Blackwell, 1980).
- (Co-authored with Stephen Hill and Bryan S. Turner) The Dominant Ideology Thesis (Allen & Unwin, 1980).
- (Co-authored with John Urry) Capital, Labour, and the Middle Classes (Allen & Unwin, 1983).
- (Co-authored with Stephen Hill and Bryan S. Turner) The Penguin Dictionary of Sociology (Penguin, 1984).
- (Co-authored with Stephen Hill and Bryan S. Turner) Sovereign Individuals of Capitalism (Allen & Unwin, 1986).
- (Co-authored with Alan Warde, Keith Soothill, Rosemary Deem, Sue Penna, Andrew Sayer, John Urry and Sylvia Walby) Contemporary British Society (Polity Press, 1988; 3rd ed. 2000).
- (Edited with Stephen Hill and Bryan S. Turner) Dominant Ideologies (Unwin Hyman, 1990).
- (Edited with Russell Keat) Enterprise Culture (Routledge, 1991).
- (Edited with Alan Warde) Social Change in Contemporary Britain (Polity Press, 1992).
- (Edited with Alan Warde) Stratification and Social Inequality: Studies in British Society (Framework Press, 1994).
- (Edited with Alan Warde) Family, Household, and Life-Course: Studies in British Society (Framework Press, 1994).
- (Edited with Russell Keat and Nigel Whiteley) The Authority of the Consumer (Routledge, 1994).
- Television and Society (Polity Press, 1996).
- (With Brian Longhurst) Audiences: A Sociological Theory of Performance and Imagination (Sage, 1998).
- (Edited with Alan Warde) The Contemporary British Society Reader (Polity Press, 2000).
