= Takeshi Nakano =

Japanese economist

- 中野剛志
- Born: October 25, 1971 (age 54); Kanagawa Prefecture
- Education: University of Tokyo (Bachelor's degree); University of Edinburgh (MSc, PhD)
- Known for: Introducing Modern Monetary Theory to Japan
- Scientific career
- Fields: History, Policy, Politics, Economics, International Relations
- Thesis: The power of nations: theoretical foundations for economic nationalism (2005)
- Doctoral advisor: Russell Keat

Takeshi Nakano (中野 剛志, Takeshi Nakano, born October 25, 1971) is a Japanese bureaucrat, conservative critic and scholar of economic thought and political thought. Together with Satoshi Fujii, he is the one who introduced Modern Monetary Theory (MMT) to Japan.

== Biography ==
Nakano was born in Kanagawa Prefecture, Japan. He was educated at Kougyokusha. He received a bachelor's degree in International Relations from University of Tokyo and studied at the "Hyogensha Jyuku", a private school founded by Susumu Nishibe. He got a M.Sc. with distinction and a Ph.D. in Politics from University of Edinburgh, Scotland.

He was an associate professor at Satoshi Fujii's lab, Kyoto University and a consulting fellow at RIETI (The Research Institute of Economy, Trade and Industry), Ministry of Economy, Trade and Industry.

He is currently serving as a director of Consumption and Distribution Policy Division, Commerce and Information Policy Bureau, Ministry of Economy, Trade and Industry.

== See also ==
- Susumu Nishibe
- Satoshi Fujii
- Economic Nationalism
