= Trust-fund tax =

Type of tax

A trust-fund tax is any type of tax in which the person or entity who is liable for the tax obtains it by collecting it from another party and holding the tax until paid to the particular government to which it is owed.

For example, a merchant collecting sales tax or an employer collecting payroll tax. The party collecting the tax is presumed to hold it in trust for the benefit of the government to whom it is due. They become liable for payment of the tax. A trust-fund tax is a type of tax or debt where (absent a personal guarantee) the management or responsible employees of a corporation or other entity with limited liability can be held personally liable for its non-payment.

Trust-fund taxes include fuel taxes, sales taxes, excise taxes, and certain payroll taxes. Generally, any tax required to be withheld from an employee's paycheck (or required to be matched by the employer and additionally paid) for which the employee is liable for (or employer, for matching contributions), such as the employee (and employer) portion of the United States Social Security and Medicare taxes, and any tax a merchant is required to collect from a customer, can be considered trust-fund taxes.

The excise tax on general aviation, to fund airports, is a trust-fund tax.

== Liability ==
A trust-fund tax has the special characteristic that if it is owed by a business entity such as a corporation or LLC, the management of the business entity can be held personally liable for payment of the tax if the entity fails to do so.

The presumption is that the entity was supposed to withhold employee-owed payroll taxes or customer-owed sales taxes, and set those funds aside from the general funds of the entity, and not allow those funds to be spent for any purpose except payment of the trust-fund tax. Thus, in effect, failing to pay a trust-fund tax is considered the equivalent of management embezzling the funds that were due, and being personally liable for non-payment. Additionally, an employee with authority to sign checks for a business can also be held liable for non-payment of trust-fund taxes if they knew or should have known the business was liable for the tax, even if the business' owner instructed them not to pay the tax.

Note that the prime characteristic of a tax being considered a trust-fund tax is that it was collected (or was supposed to be collected) from a third party, and failure to pay a trust fund tax by an entity allows the taxing authority to optionally look to the managers, responsible employees and potentially owners of the entity for the unpaid taxes.

For example, if a corporation goes bankrupt, owing $100,000 in income tax, the managers of a business entity (corporation, limited liability company, etc.) have no personal liability for this tax (it is owed by the entity on its own), but if it owed $500 in sales taxes the government to whom it is due can go after management as a personal liability for the tax (the entity was supposed to collect the tax in trust for that government, segregate the funds until due and pay it).

In some cases non-payment of trust fund taxes can be more serious than non-payment of income or other taxes. In California, for example, it is a misdemeanor for the management of a business entity to willfully fail to remit trust-fund taxes such as any withholding from an employee's wages made pursuant to a state or local law, and if the amount of tax due exceeds $500 the class of crime becomes a felony. On the other hand, income tax evasion is punishable with a fine and/or imprisonment. The IRS can assess penalties as well.

== See also ==
- Trust Fund Recovery Penalty
