= Ethnic option =

Concept in sociology

Ethnic option is a term coined by sociologist Mary C. Waters to express her conception that ethnic identity of the descendants of white European immigrants is flexible, symbolic and voluntary, not a definitive aspect of their identity. Waters argues that with the achievement of middle-class suburban status, ethnicity becomes a lifestyle option, a costless form of community.

== See also ==
- Acting white
- Cultural appropriation
- European Americans
- Symbolic ethnicity
- White ethnic
