= Janet Wolff =

British sociologist (born 1943)

- Born: 25 March 1943 (age 83); Manchester, United Kingdom
- Occupations: Sociologist; art historian; aesthetician
- Awards: Guggenheim Fellowship (1993)

Academic background
- Education: University of Birmingham

Academic work
- Discipline: Sociology of art
- Institutions: University of Leeds; University of Rochester; Columbia University; University of Manchester

Janet Wolff (born 25 March 1943) is a British sociologist and art historian. After working for some time as a secretary at the North Western Gas Board, she decided to attend university after seeing her sister go to one, and she obtained her BSS and PhD at the University of Birmingham. She worked at University of Leeds, University of Rochester, Columbia University, and eventually the University of Manchester, where she retired as professor emeritus. She has written several books on sociology and art studies, and following her retirement from Manchester, the history of Manchester.

== Biography ==
=== Early life and education ===
Wolff, of German Jewish descent, was born on 25 March 1943 in Manchester to Rosabelle (née Noar) and chemist/company director Arthur Wolff. Her father was born in Berlin and fled the antisemitic Nazi regime to Eccles, Greater Manchester, working for Lankro Chemicals. Several of her relatives were murdered in the Holocaust.

Wolff's family lived in northern Manchester before they moved to Didsbury, and she was educated at Manchester High School for Girls. She attended Miss Wilkinson's Secretarial College for Gentlewomen and worked at the North Western Gas Board as a manager's private secretary. She then decided to attend a university after her sister went to one in Bristol, and she studied moral and political philosophy at the University of Birmingham, where she obtained a BSS with first class honors in 1968 and a PhD in sociology and the arts in 1972. She also spent two years attending the London Contemporary Dance School from 1970 to 1972.

=== Academic and writing career ===
In 1973, Wolff became a lecturer at University of Leeds after Zygmunt Bauman offered a teaching job there. She stepped down from her job at Leeds in 1989 and moved to California. She was Professor of Art History/Visual and Cultural Studies at the University of Rochester, where she directed the PhD program in visual and cultural studies (1991–2001). She was later Professor of Arts at Columbia University, where she served as Associate Dean for Academic Affairs at the School of the Arts from 2001 to 2006. She eventually received several job offers from institutions based in the UK, and in 2006, she became a professor at the University of Manchester. She retired from the university in 2010 and was eventually promoted to professor emeritus.

Wolff focuses on the sociology of art; aesthetics; and 20th-century art. She is author of Hermeneutic Philosophy and the Sociology of Art (1975), Aesthetics and the Sociology of Art (1983), Feminine Sentences: Essays on Women and Culture (1990), Resident Alien: Feminist Cultural Criticism (1995), and AngloModern: Painting and Modernity in Britain and the United States (2003), and she edited The Sociology of Literature: Theoretical Approaches (1977) with Jane Routh. She was part of the British Sociological Association's executive committee from 1977 to 1979. In 1993, she was awarded a Guggenheim Fellowship.

Wolff became interested in non-academic writing after retiring from Manchester. In 2017, she published Austerity Baby, a narrative volume on exile and displacement, through Manchester University Press. She has also co-edited several books on the history of Manchester, such as Culture in Manchester (2013), The Photographs of Zygmunt Bauman (2023), and The Simons of Manchester (2024).

=== Personal life ===
Originally living in Woodhouse during her time at Leeds, Wolff moved to Didsbury as part of her return to the United Kingdom. After the United Kingdom voted in favor of Brexit, Wolff became a German dual citizen by descent.

Although Wolff had often went to synagogues with her parents during her youth, the family "[wasn't] very involved", and she later identified as a Jewish atheist after starting her academic career.

Wolff was once diagnosed with thyroid cancer, something she attributed to water tainted by the Windscale fire in 1957.

== Works ==
- Hermeneutic Philosophy and the Sociology of Art (1975) (Note: Reviews of this book:)
- (ed. with Jane Routh) The Sociology of Literature: Theoretical Approaches (1977)
- (ed. with Michele Barrett, Philip Corrigan, and Annette Kuhn) Ideology and Cultural Production (1979) (Note: Reviews of this book:)
- The Social Production of Art (1981) (Note: Reviews of this book:)
- Aesthetics and the Sociology of Art (1983) (Note: Reviews of this book:)
- (ed. with John Seed) The Culture of Capital: Art, Power and the Nineteenth-Century Middle Class (1988) (Note: Reviews of this book:)
- Feminine Sentences: Essays on Women and Culture (1990) (Note: Reviews of this book:)
- Resident Alien: Feminist Cultural Criticism (1995) (Note: Reviews of this book:)
- AngloModern: Painting and Modernity in Britain and the United States (2003) (Note: Reviews of this book:)
- The Aesthetics of Uncertainty (2008)
- (ed. with Mike Savage) Culture in Manchester (2013)
- (ed. with Jackie Stacey) Writing Otherwise (2013)
- (ed. with Peter Beilharz) The Photographs of Zygmunt Bauman (2023)
- (ed. with John Ayshford and others) The Simons of Manchester (2024)
