= Mary C. Waters =

American sociologist (born 1957)

Mary C. Waters FAAAS
- Born: c. 1957
- Awards: Guggenheim Fellowship; American Sociological Association Distinguished Scholarly Book Award; Member of the National Academy of Sciences

Academic background
- Education: Johns Hopkins University; University of California at Berkeley

Academic work
- Discipline: sociology
- Institutions: Harvard University
- Main interests: integration of immigrants
- Notable works: Black Identities: West Indian Immigrant Ideas and American Realities; Inheriting the City: The Children of Immigrants Come of Age

Mary Catherine Waters (born c. 1957) is an American sociologist, demographer and author. She is the John L. Loeb Professor of Sociology and the PVK Professor of Arts and Sciences at Harvard University. Much of her work has focused on immigrants, the meaning of racial and ethnic identity, and how immigrants integrate into a new society. Waters chaired the 2015 National Research Council Panel on The Integration of Immigrants into American Society.

Her books have received multiple awards. Waters has been elected to the American Philosophical Society, the American Academy of Arts and Sciences and the National Academy of Sciences. As of August 2023, Waters became a co-editor of the Annual Review of Sociology.

== Personal ==
Waters grew up in Brooklyn, New York, where she attended Our Lady Help of Christians elementary school and Saint Saviour High School. She now lives in Cambridge, Massachusetts.

== Career ==
Waters earned her B.A. in philosophy from Johns Hopkins University in 1978. She went on to earn her first M.A. in Demography in 1981 and her second M.A. in 1983 from the University of California at Berkeley, along with her PhD in Sociology in 1986.

Waters has taught at Harvard University since 1986 and has served on multiple boards and committees at Harvard, including chairing the Sociology Department. She has been named the M.E. Zukerman Professor of Sociology, the John L. Loeb Professor of Sociology and (as of 2018) the PVK Professor of Arts and Sciences.

Waters specializes in the study of immigration, identity formation and inter-group relations, with an emphasis on ethnic and racial identity among the children of immigrants. She examines the formation and measurement of race and identity and has testified before Congress and worked with the United States census on its framing of measures of racial and ethnic identity. She also studies the social determinants of health and long term resilience and recovery from disasters. She is the principal investigator in a longitudinal study of the effects of Hurricane Katrina on African-American single mothers from New Orleans.

Waters has written or edited at least 13 books, and published numerous papers. She is noted for her concept of ethnic option, according to which the children and descendants of immigrants have the option of choosing whether or not to identify with the ethnicity of their ancestors. Waters notes, however, that there are four specific factors which influence that choice: “knowledge about ancestors, surname, looks, and the relative rankings of the groups.” The term first appeared in her book Ethnic Options, Choosing Identities in America (1990).

Her book Black Identities: West Indian Immigrant Ideas and American Realities (1999) won five scholarly awards. Her underlying research for the book has been described as a "methodological tour de force" presenting multiple perspectives on race, class, ethnicity and generations. Inheriting the City: The Children of Immigrants Come of Age (2008) has also won multiple awards. It has been described as "a deeply learned, richly empirical, and elegantly written tour de force" that appreciates the complexity of immigrant lives. The authors suggested that second generation immigrants were able to choose helpful aspects from both their parents' culture and the culture of their native-born peers, enabling them to become more successful. The work was considered "methodologically innovative" for the techniques it used to randomly select a sample of people to study, and for its matching of similar immigrant and non-immigrant control groups (e.g. West Indian immigrants and African-Americans.)

Waters chaired the 2015 NRC Panel on The Integration of Immigrants into American Society and co-edited the resulting 2016 book, The Integration of Immigrants into American Society. Its research counters a number of myths about the impact of immigration. Results showed that cities with large immigrant populations actually had lower crime rates, not higher ones. The research showed that immigration positively affected long-term economic growth, housing markets and labor markets, without negatively impacting native-born workers. The work also showed that immigrants become more like native-born Americans through successive generations, a phenomenon that includes both benefits such as higher educational level and deficits such as poorer health.

Waters serves on the governing council of the National Academy of Sciences, and was appointed in 2023 to a committee that advises the Division of Behavioral and Social Sciences and Education (DBASSE) at the National Academies of Sciences, Engineering, and Medicine. As of August 2023, Waters became a co-editor of the Annual Review of Sociology.

== Awards and honors ==
- 1993, Guggenheim Fellowship, John Simon Guggenheim Memorial Foundation
- 1999–2004, named "Harvard College Professor", Harvard University, an honor for excellence in teaching
- 2001, Mira Komarovsky Award, Eastern Sociological Society, for Black Identities: West Indian Immigrant Ideas and American Realities. Harvard University Press. 2001.
- 2001, Award for Distinguished Contribution to Scholarship in Population, American Sociological Association, for Black Identities: West Indian Immigrant Ideas and American Realities. Harvard University Press. 2001.
- 2005, elected to the American Philosophical Society
- 2006, elected to the American Academy of Arts and Sciences.
- 2009, The Section on International Migration's Thomas and Znaniecki Best Book Award, American Sociological Association for Inheriting the City: The Children of Immigrants. Russell Sage Foundation, 2008.
- 2009, Mira Komarovsky Award, Eastern Sociological Society, for Inheriting the City: The Children of Immigrants. Russell Sage Foundation, 2008.
- 2010, Distinguished Scholarly Book Award, American Sociological Association, for Inheriting the City: The Children of Immigrants Come of Age. Russell Sage Foundation, 2008.
- 2010, elected to the National Academy of Sciences
- 2016, The Section on International Migration's Distinguished Career Award, American Sociological Association

== Works ==
=== Books ===
- Waters, Mary C.; Lieberson, Stanley (1988). From Many Strands: Ethnic and Racial Groups in Contemporary America. Russell Sage Foundation Press. ISBN 978-0871545435.
- Waters, Mary C. (1990). Ethnic Options: Choosing Identities in America. University of California Press. ISBN 978-0520070837.
- Waters, Mary C. (2001). Black Identities: West Indian Immigrant Dreams and American Realities. Russell Sage Foundation Books at Harvard University Press. ISBN 978-0674007246.
- Waters, Mary C.; Levitt, Peggy (2002). The Changing Face of Home: The Transnational Lives of the Second Generation. Russell Sage Foundation Press. ISBN 978-0871545176. Archived from the original on 2014-08-26. (ed.)
- Waters, Mary C.; Perlmann, Joel (2002). The New Race Question: How the Census Counts Multiracial Individuals. Russell Sage Foundation Press. ISBN 978-0871546579. (ed.)
- Waters, Mary C.; Devine, Fiona (2004). Social inequalities in comparative perspective. Malden, Massachusetts: Blackwell Publishing. ISBN 9780631226857.
- Waters, Mary C.; Kasinitz, Philip; Mollenkopf, John H. (2004). Becoming New Yorkers: Ethnographies of the New Second Generation. Russell Sage Foundation Press. ISBN 978-0871544360. Archived from the original on 2015-06-12. (ed.)
- Waters, Mary C.; Ueda, Reed; Marrow, Helen B. (2007). The New Americans: A Guide to Immigration since 1965. Harvard University Press. ISBN 978-0674023574. (ed.)
- Waters, Mary C.; Kasinitz, Philip; Mollenkopf, John H.; Holdaway, Jennifer (2009). Inheriting the City: The Children of Immigrants Come of Age. Russell Sage Foundation Press. ISBN 978-0871544780.
- Waters, Mary C.; Carr, Patrick J.; Kefalas, Maria J.; Holdaway, Jennifer (2011). Coming of Age in America: The Transition to Adulthood in the Twenty-First Century. University of California Press. ISBN 978-0520270930. (ed.)
- Waters, Mary C.; Pineau, Marisa Gerstein, eds. (2016). The integration of immigrants into American society: panel on the integration of immigrants into American society. Washington, DC: National Academies Press. ISBN 978-0-309-37398-2.

=== Chapters in books ===
- Waters, Mary C.; Devine, Fiona (2004), "Introduction", in Waters, Mary C.; Devine, Fiona (eds.), Social inequalities in comparative perspective, Malden, Massachusetts: Blackwell Publishing, pp. 1–19, ISBN 9780631226857.
- Waters, Mary C. (2004), "Race, ethnicity, and immigration in the United States", in Waters, Mary C.; Devine, Fiona (eds.), Social inequalities in comparative perspective, Malden, Massachusetts: Blackwell Publishing, pp. 20–38, ISBN 9780631226857.
