= Rosemary Crompton =

Rosemary Crompton, FBA (née Baxendale; 22 April 1942 – 17 August 2011) was a British sociologist and academic, specialising in gender and social class. She was Professor of Sociology at City University from 1999 to 2008: she was then appointed professor emeritus. She had previously been a research assistant at the University of Cambridge, a lecturer at the University of East Anglia and at the University of Kent, and held a chair at the University of Leicester.

== Honours ==
In 2007, Crompton was elected a Fellow of the British Academy (FBA), the United Kingdom's national academy for the humanities and social sciences.

== Selected works ==
- Crompton, Rosemary; Jones, Gareth (1984). White-Collar Proletariat: Deskilling and Gender in Clerical Work. London: Macmillan. ISBN 978-0333327531.
- Crompton, Rosemary; Sanderson, Kate (1990). Gendered jobs and social change. London: Unwin Hyman. ISBN 978-0044455974.
- Crompton, Rosemary (1997). Women and work in modern Britain. Oxford: Oxford University Press. ISBN 978-0198780960.
- Crompton, Rosemary (1998). Class and stratification: an introduction to current debates (2nd ed.). Cambridge: Polity Press. ISBN 978-0745617923.
- Crompton, Rosemary (1999). Restructuring gender relations and employment: the decline of the male breadwinner. Oxford: Oxford University Press. ISBN 978-0198296089.
- Devine, Fiona; Savage, Mike; Scott, John; Crompton, Rosemary (2005). Rethinking class: culture, identities and lifestyles. Basingstoke, Hampshire New York: Palgrave Macmillan. ISBN 978-0333968956.
- Crompton, Rosemary (2006). Employment and the family: the reconfiguration of work and family life in contemporary societies. Cambridge: Cambridge University Press. ISBN 978-0521840910.
- Crompton, Rosemary (2008). Class and stratification (3rd ed.). Cambridge: Polity. ISBN 978-0745638690.
