= Satoshi Fujii =

Japanese academic

- 藤井 聡
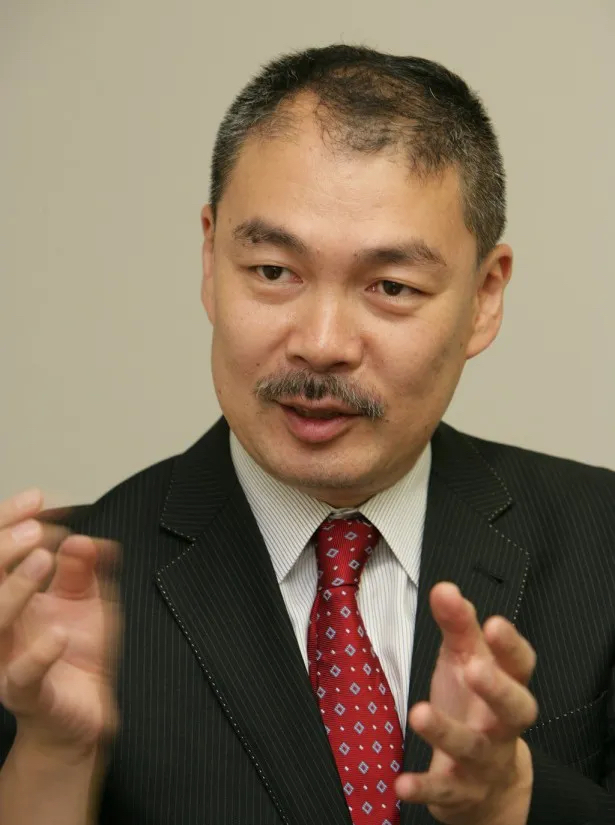
- Born: October 15, 1968 (age 57); Ikoma, Nara, Japan

Academic background
- Education: Kyoto University (Bachelor, Master, Doctor)
- Influences: Susumu Nishibe, Charles Sanders Peirce

Academic work
- School or tradition: Conservatism; Nationalism; Pragmatism; Modern Monetary Theory; Anti-globalism; Anti-neoliberalism
- Institutions: Kyoto University; University of Gothenburg; Karlstad University; Tokyo Institute of Technology
- Main interests: Civil engineering, Transportation, Social psychology, behavioral economics, Public policy
- Notable ideas: National Resilience (Kokudo Kyōjinka)
- Website: Official website

Satoshi Fujii (藤井聡, Fujii Satoshi) is a Japanese civil engineer, economist and social critic, who served as a special advisor to the Abe cabinet until his voluntary Retirement. He is Professor of civil engineering at Kyoto University and the editor-in-chief of Hyogensha Criterion, an academic journal in Japan.

Fujii defends nationalism, public works, and modern monetary theory, and is opposed to excessive globalization and neoliberalism. He is a proponent of pragmatism and conservatism. He, along with Takeshi Nakano, has spread MMT to Japan from a conservative standpoint.

== Biography ==
Born in Ikoma, Nara. Received his Bachelor's, Master's, and Doctor's degrees in civil engineering from Kyoto University. After working at Kyoto University and the University of Gothenburg, he became an associate professor at Tokyo Institute of Technology and then a professor. He became a professor at Kyoto University in 2009. He was a visiting professor at Karlstad University in 2018.

Fujii was selected as a special advisor of "New Deal for Disaster Prevention and Mitigation" to the Abe Cabinet in 2012. However, he opposed the consumption tax hike in 2017 and resigned.

== Conflict with Ishin Party ==
Fujii is one of the main critics of the Ishin Party, founded by Toru Hashimoto. Fujii is extremely negative about the Osaka Metropolis Plan (大阪都構想, an idea of an Osaka metropolitan government, which would eliminate the dual administration and promote privatization).
