= Trust Fund Recovery Penalty =

Type of penalty in American tax law

In the United States, the term trust fund recovery penalty refers to a tax penalty assessed against the directors or officers of a business entity which failed to pay a required tax on behalf of its employees. Common violations can come in the form of not paying Medicare and Social Security deductions.

== See also ==
- Payroll tax
- Piercing the corporate veil
- Trust-fund tax
