= BBC Lab UK =

British science website

BBC Lab UK was a BBC website that allowed the public to take part in online experiments by completing tests and surveys. The website was active for four years until its data collection ceased in May 2013. Details of the experiments and projects have now been archived.

Lab UK was commissioned in 2008 by BBC Commissioner Lisa Sargood, inspired by other online 'citizen science' projects such as Galaxy Zoo, the BBC Climate Change Experiment and BugGuide. The intention was to enable leading academics to harness the BBC's audience, using mass public participation to explore scientific hypotheses with very large data sets. The results would be published in academic journals and made available to the public through the BBC website and television.

Lab UK was conceived by BBC executive producer Richard Cable, who also edited it from 2008 to 2011. A number of professional scientists were engaged to consult on the design and development of the website, as well as the design of individual experiments which the public would engage with.

Each web experiment was structured to give feedback on the activity of the participant, immediately after they had submitted their data. Collectively, the experiment data would be handed over securely to the scientist who had designed the experiment. The analysis of the experiment data would be conducted by the scientist's research team. Where possible, the BBC actively encouraged the publication of the results in peer-reviewed journals.

The first experiment was published in 2009 and the final experiment was launched in 2012. The website stopped collecting data in May 2013 after its migration to the Knowledge & Learning product. The website was formally archived in March 2016.

== History ==
The BBC's iF&L department had published several online quizzes to accompany BBC science television programming. Scientists such as Dr. Val Curtis and Dr. Stian Reimers asked whether they might analyse the anonymous data generated by the completion of these online quizzes. In 'The Disgust Test' and 'Sex ID', specific hypotheses were tested in the online experiments. The results were published in specialist journals. BBC's Multiplatform commissioners decided to make a re-usable experiment publication platform that could save all data to a common database.

== Experiments ==
=== The Big Stress Test ===
The Big Stress Test was Lab UK's beta launch candidate in May 2009. The experiment was designed by Professor Peter Kinderman from the University of Liverpool and Dr Sara Tai from the University of Manchester. The experiment was promoted via the BBC's mental health and wellbeing website 'Headroom'. This experiment received roughly 6,000 participants. The experiment was updated and re-launched in 2011.

=== Brain Test Britain ===
A collaboration with the Medical Research Council, Cambridge University, King's College London, the Alzheimer's Society and the BBC One Television programme, Bang Goes The Theory - this longitudinal experiment, launched in September 2009, sought to discover whether brain training games made any improvement to IQ for a healthy, general population. The Lab UK website hosted a series of brain training games and the study was structured as a clinical randomised controlled trial. The study contained over 60,000 people for six weeks. The study designers, Dr Adrian Owen and Professor Clive Ballard analysed the data and concluded the games made no difference to a healthy adult population. The results were published in Nature and televised on a BBC One special.

=== The Big Personality Test ===
Launched on BBC One's One Show in November 2009, this cross-sectional survey was developed in partnership with University of Cambridge. It used the Big Five personality measure and a range of other well-used psychometric and health measures to determine the correlations between personality and life outcomes. The results informed the returning series 'Child of Our Time'. The online website featured interactive video presented by Professor Robert Winston which presented your personal results of the personality test. The experiment received over 100,000 participants in the first two days and has received more than 750,000 participants in total.

=== The Web Behaviour Test ===
This experiment was launched in conjunction with the BBC Two programme 'The Virtual Revolution' in February 2010.

=== How Musical Are You? ===
Developed by researchers at Goldsmiths College, University of London, this experiment explored the relationship between potentially untapped musical ability and musical sophistication. The test was promoted in conjunction with BBC Radio 3's 'Genius of Mozart' season in January 2011.

=== The Great British Class Survey ===
This was the first social science experiment to be co-commissioned by the BBC's Current Affairs department. Professor Mike Savage and Professor Fiona Devine designed a survey to measure different sociological capitals. The stated ambition was to create a new snapshot of British society and develop some newer, more relevant class labels for the 21st century. The BBC later commissioned a face-to-face recruited survey of roughly 1000 people to overcome the intrinsic class bias of the BBC audience. The survey was promoted on BBC One's One Show by Professor Mike Savage in January 2011. (also see 'The Great British Class Survey')

=== The Big Money Test ===
Collaborating with BBC One's consumer programme Watchdog, this experiment aimed to discover the psychological traits that led to money problems in a large general population. The test was designed by Mark Fenton-O'Creevy from the Open University and Adrian Furnham, University College London. It was launched in April 2011 by Watchdog's finance presenter, Martin Lewis, who featured in the interactive video feedback.

=== The Big Risk Test ===
This experiment was developed by Professor David Spiegelhalter and Dr. Mike Aitken of Cambridge University. It tested a hypothesis of linkage between numeracy and judgement of risk. The experiment contained various verified measures and a selection of interactive puzzles which tested various aspects of risk judgement. The experiment was promoted on the BBC One science TV programme, "Bang Goes the Theory" in April 2011.

=== The BBC Stress Test ===
This updated version of the earlier experiment presented more comprehensive feedback and was re-launched by Claudia Hammond on BBC Radio 4's 'All in the Mind' in June 2011.

=== The Get Yourself Hired Test ===
This experiment into job seekers' psychological skills accompanied BBC Three's 'Up For Hire' programme. It was promoted in October 2011.

=== Test Your Morality ===
This experiment was developed by researchers at the London School of Hygiene and Tropical Medicine. Building on from 'The Disgust Test', this test aimed to test a Human Superorganism hypothesis, and an evolutionary theory of human morals. The survey contained detailed demographic information and 33 'vignettes' which attempted to test people's responses to immoral behaviour across different moral domains. The test was promoted in November 2011.

=== Can You Compete Under Pressure? ===
This experiment was developed by researchers from Sheffield and Wolverhampton Universities. The experiment aimed to test how effective 4 different sports psychology techniques were compared to a control in improving performance at a simple number grid task. The test provided randomised psychological interventions to participants via video clips from Olympic sprinter, Michael Johnson. Participants played the 'Grid' game four times and their performance improvement (or not) was measured. Part of the interactive video feedback by Johnson was the first item to be filmed at Lund Point, the decommissioned block of flats in Stratford that was to become BBC TV's Olympic HQ. The experiment was launched by Michael Johnson on BBC One's The One show in May 2012.

== Results ==
=== The Stress Test ===
The original data was combined with the data from the re-launched experiment. The findings were significant and were publicised both in peer-reviewed journals and on BBC News and Radio platforms. An All in the Mind special edition detailed some of the 'thinking styles' which can lead to depression. More than 30,000 cases of data were analysed to find these results.

=== Brain Test Britain ===
The data from the longitudinal study was analysed and the results were featured in Nature - 'Putting brain training to the test'. The results were publicised on BBC One's Bang Goes the Theory Television programme. The results have caused some controversy, as some researchers said the study ignored the training effects on older, less healthy subjects and that the study instruments weren't sufficiently similar to commercially available products.

=== The Big Personality Test ===
Preliminary results were extracted from the initial data, which contained more than 100,000 cases. These were used to inform the subject matter of the BBC One TV programme, 'Child of Our Time' which aired in May 2010. Over 500,000 cases were recorded in the database by May 2013. The first peer-reviewed paper published based on these data, concerned the psychological aspects of childhood sexual abuse survivors. A study has been published examining the geographical associations between personality and life satisfaction using over 50,000 cases from residents of London. A further study, mapping the regional differences in personality in Great Britain was published in PLoS One. These two studies were the basis for the BBC iWonder's interactive guide "Where in Britain would you be happiest?"

=== The Web Behaviour Test ===
Over 50,000 people completed the survey. The results were written up in the Journal of Information Management in 2011. The authors believed they detected differences between 'generations' in their information seeking strategies with younger people apparently possessing "poorer working memories and are less competent at multi-tasking"

=== The Big Money Test ===
Over 100,000 people completed the survey. Results were written up in a series of papers. The authors found money attitudes (money as power, security, generosity or autonomy) and financial capabilities (making ends meet, keeping track, planning ahead, and staying informed) to be significant predictors of experiencing adverse financial events ranging from denial of credit to bankruptcy). The test found clear linkages between impulse buying behaviour and serious financial problems and found impulse buying behaviour to be predicted by difficulties in emotion regulation. Combining data with the Big Personality Test they also found impulse buying behaviour to be predicted by personality and money attitudes.

=== How Musical Are You? ===
Over 150,00 people completed the test. The researchers' findings were published in PLoS One in February 2014.

=== Test Your Morality ===
80,000 test responses were analysed from 202 countries. The researchers' findings were published in 'Culture and Evolution' in February 2023.

=== The Great British Class Survey ===
Over 150,000 cases of data plus the recruited GfK survey led to a paper in Sociology. This was synchronised with the publication in March 2013 in the BBC News website of the Great British Class Calculator. The calculator is a web application that asks seven questions from the original survey, and categorises each person into the newly found class categories, depending on their results. The calculator was extremely popular with it being used over 6.5 million times in a week. However it was misunderstood in some quarters with some people thinking it generated the results itself, rather than analysis of the original survey data. The Class Calculator spawned spoofs in popular media but also serious criticism in social science circles. The paper published by Sage Journals is the most downloaded Sociology journal paper of all time with over 23,000 downloads. The paper revealed a new class system for Britain with seven classes which described the changing stratification of modern Britain and the reduction of size of traditional class segments like the working class and the traditional middle class.

=== Can You Compete Under Pressure? ===
Over 110,000 people took part, with a sample of 44,000 analysed. The results were written up in the Frontiers of Psychology journal and found that brief online psychological training could be effect in improving performance, especially the use of the 'self-talk' technique. Other findings noted the importance of emotional control, and the general improvement of the control group throughout the trials demonstrating the value of practice and Michael Johnson's control interventions.

== Technical challenges ==
The BBC Lab UK platform was built using the BBC's new Forge application server, and was interconnected with other BBC online services such as BBC ID, BBC EMP, MemCache amongst others. BBC ID was employed as a sign-ed service was needed to help keep participant's data secure, and to prevent malicious submissions. The BBC Lab UK platform was re-built three times. First in 2010 to improve scalability. Second, in 2011 to reduce load times and server load. A third time in 2012 to re-factor after substantial changes in the BBC online infrastructure.

== De-commission ==
After BBC Multiplatform's dissolution in 2011, BBC Lab UK was one of a number of web products migrated to the new Knowledge & Learning product. Senior management decided in 2013 that all technical effort would now be spent building this product rather than supporting the Lab UK service. From 1 May 2013, the website stopped collecting experiment data, although most of the experiments still offer feedback to those who have already completed the tests. The website was permanently 'mothballed' on 18 March 2016.

== Data deposition ==
The data from the Great British Class Survey has been deposited in the UK Data Archive (University of Essex) for use by other academic researchers. Data from 'The Big Personality Test' and 'The Big Money Test' have also been deposited.

== Legacy ==
Learnings from the Lab UK project were used during the development of the Open University's citizen science platform nQuire, which was built in partnership with the BBC. Since its launch in 2018, nQuire has collaborated with the BBC on a number of citizen science projects including The Feel Good Test, The 2019 Gardenwatch Surveys, and a series of surveys about literature inspired by The Novels That Shaped Our World.
