= Q-1 visa =

The Q-1 visa is a non-immigrant visa which allows travel to the United States to participate in a cultural exchange program. The purpose of the program is to allow for practical training and employment, and the sharing of history, culture, and traditions.

Roughly 2,000 Q-1 visas have been issued in each fiscal year from 2014 to 2018. The visa is frequently utilized by the Walt Disney Company to staff the various pavilions around the world showcase portion of its Epcot theme park at Walt Disney World. Because of this, the visa is sometimes referred to as the "Disney visa."

Participants must be 18 years or older and be able to communicate effectively regarding elements of their culture. The duration of stay may be up to 15 months, and participants must then remain outside the US for a period of one year before they are eligible to apply for another Q-1 visa.

The Q-1 visa is similar to the J-1 visa, except that J-1 cultural exchange programs must be designated by the US Department of State, Bureau of Educational and Cultural Affairs.

== See also ==
- Walt Disney World International Program
