= Payroll tax =

Tax imposed on employers or employees

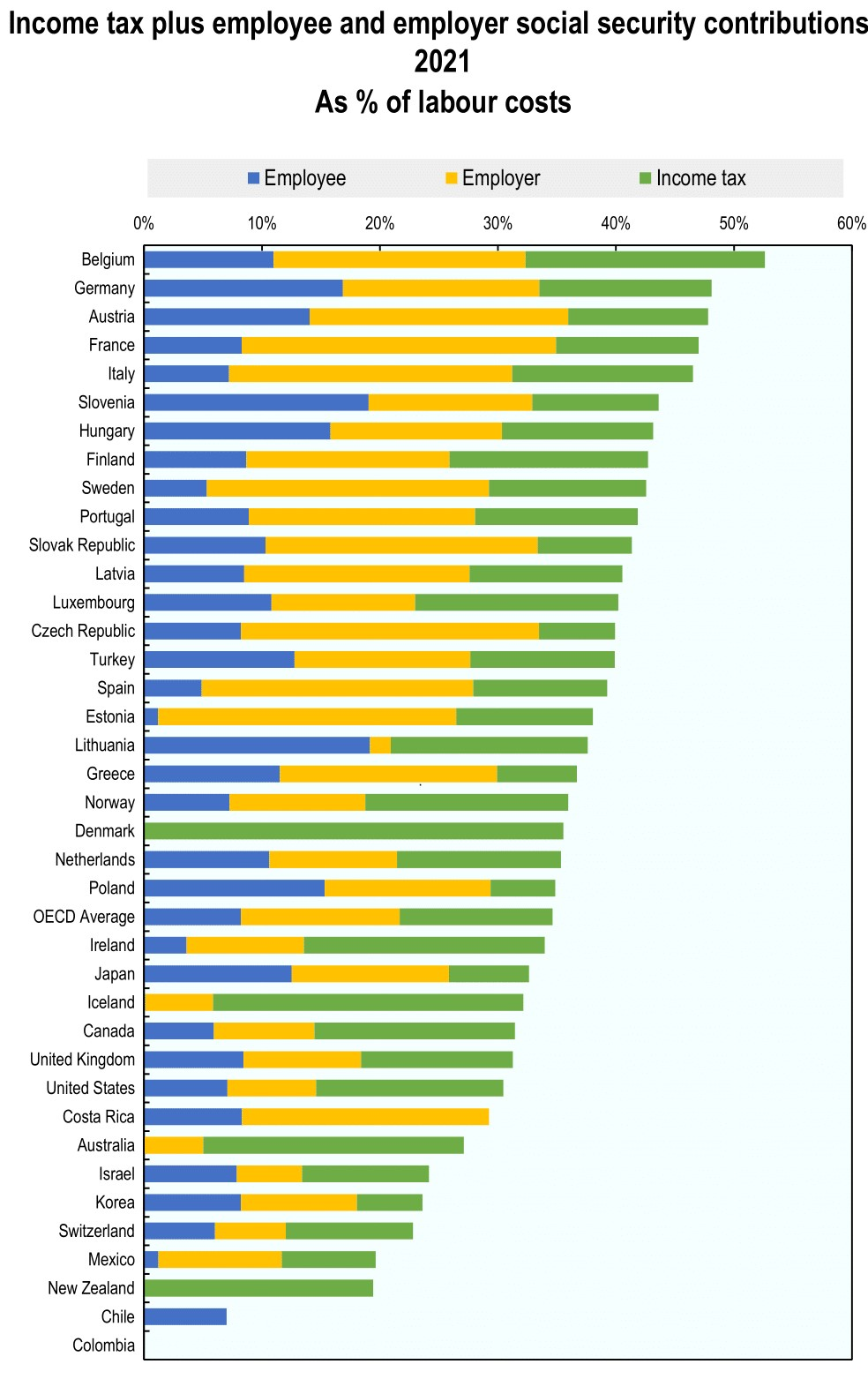
Payroll and income tax by OECD Country

A payroll tax may be imposed on employers or employees. They are usually calculated as a percentage of the salaries that employers pay their employees. By law, some payroll taxes are the responsibility of the employee and others fall on the employer, but almost all economists agree that the true economic incidence of a payroll tax is unaffected by this distinction, and falls largely or entirely on workers in the form of lower wages. Because payroll taxes fall exclusively on wages and not on returns to financial or physical investments, payroll taxes may contribute to underinvestment in human capital.

== National payroll tax systems in countries around the world ==
=== Australia ===
Payroll taxes in Australia are levied by state governments and not at a federal level. Payroll tax rates and the threshold at which these are levied vary between states.

=== Bermuda ===
In Bermuda, payroll tax accounts for over a 3rd of the annual national budget, making it the primary source of government revenue. The tax is paid by employers based on the total remuneration (salary and benefits) paid to all employees, at a standard rate of 14% (though, under certain circumstances, can be as low as 4.75%). Employers are allowed to deduct a small percentage of an employee's pay (around 4%). Another tax, social insurance, is withheld by the employer.

=== Brazil ===
In Brazil, employers are required to withhold 11% of the employee's wages for Social Security and a certain percentage as Income Tax (according to the applicable tax bracket). The employer is required to contribute an additional 20% of the total payroll value to the Social Security system. Depending on the company's main activity, the employer must also contribute to federally funded insurance and educational programs.

There is also a required deposit of 8% of the employee's wages (not withheld from him) into a bank account that can be withdrawn only when the employee is fired, or under certain other extraordinary circumstances, such as serious illness (called a "Security Fund for Duration of Employment"). All these contributions amount to a total tax burden of almost 40% of the payroll for the employer and 15% of the employee's wages.

=== Canada ===
The Northwest Territories in Canada applies a payroll tax of 2% to all employees. It is an example of the second type of payroll tax, but unlike in other jurisdictions, it is paid directly by employees rather than employers. Unlike the first type of payroll tax as it is applied in Canada, though, there is no basic personal exemption below which employees are not required to pay the tax.

Ontario applies a health premium tax to all payrolls on a sliding scale up to $900 per year.

=== China ===
In China, the payroll tax is a specific tax that is paid to provinces and territories by employers, not by employees. The tax is deducted from the worker's pay. The Chinese Government itself requires only one tax to be withheld from paychecks: the PAYG (or pay-as-you-go) tax, which includes medicare levies and insurances.

Tax calculations and contributions differ from city to city in China, and each city's data will be updated yearly.

Taxable Income = Gross Salary – Social Benefits – ¥3,500 IIT = Taxable Income x Tax Rate – Quick Deduction Net Salary = Gross Salary – Social Benefits – IIT

=== Croatia ===
In Croatia, the payroll tax is composed of several items:

- national income tax on personal income (Croatian: porez na dohodak), which is applied incrementally with rates of 0% (personal exemption = 3800 HRK), 24% (3800-30000 HRK) and 36% (30000 HRK - )
- optional local surcharge on personal income (Croatian: prirez), which is applied by some cities and municipalities on the amount of national tax, currently up to 18% (in Zagreb)
- pension insurance (Croatian: mirovinsko osiguranje), universal 20%, for some people divided into two different funds, one of which is government-managed (15%) and the other is a personal pension fund (5%)
- health insurance (Croatian: zdravstveno osiguranje), universal 16.5%
- health insurance exemption exists for the population below 30 years of age as part of government policy to encourage youth employment.

=== Czech Republic ===
The income tax in the Czech Republic is progressive. The primary tax rate is 15% of gross income, but for an annual salary that is 48 times bigger than the average monthly salary (38.911 CZK in 2022, around 1.600 EUR), the rate is 23%. That applies only to the difference. The minimum wage to pay income tax is 27.840CZK in 2021 (approx. 1140EUR).

For people with trade certificates, the rate applies only to 40% of their revenue. The remaining 60% can be deducted as a standard expense. Freelancers also have to file an Income tax return every year.

Taxpayers can apply a few tax deductions, such as a deduction for a child (starting at approx. 600EUR annually in 2021), for being a student (approx. 160EUR in 2021), for a dependent spouse (approx. 1000EUR in 2021) and more.

Health and social insurance are mandatory and a part of a payroll tax. The health insurance rate is 13,5%. For employees with a salary higher than the minimum wage (16.200CZK in the year 2022, approximately 660EUR), 9% pay the employers, and only 4,5% pay the employees. Trade license workers pay it themselves. Categories that do not have to pay health and social insurance are, for example, students or people registered at the unemployment department. The social insurance rate is 31,5% for employees (6,5% paid by the employee and 25% by the employer) and 29,2% for freelancers.

The income tax makes up to half of the national income. The health and social insurance make another 30-40%.

=== Finland ===
In Finland, payroll taxes and mandatory social security contributions are divided into those deducted from the employee's gross salary (withholding) and those paid by the employer.

As of 2025, employees are subject to the following withholdings:

- Pension insurance fee (työeläkevakuutusmaksu): 7.15% for employees aged 17–52 and 63–67; 8.65% for those aged 53–62.
- Unemployment insurance fee (työttömyysvakuutusmaksu): 0.59% for employees aged 18–64.
- Health insurance daily allowance contribution (päivärahamaksu): 1.01% on gross income if annual income exceeds €16,862; otherwise 0%.

Employers pay separate social security contributions based on the total wages paid:

- Pension insurance contribution (TyEL): Averages approximately 17.38%.
- Health insurance contribution (sava-maksu): 1.87%.
- Unemployment insurance contribution: 0.20% on the first €2,455,500 of payroll; 0.80% on the amount exceeding the limit.
- Other insurance: Accident and occupational disease insurance (avg. 0.54%) and Group life insurance (avg. 0.06%).

In addition to these specific payroll fees, employers are obligated to withhold income taxes from the employee's salary (Pay-As-You-Earn). This includes the progressive state income tax, a flat municipal tax (approx. 4.4%–10.9%), and, where applicable, church tax and public broadcasting tax.

=== France ===
In France, statutory payroll tax only covers employee and employer contributions to the social security system. Income tax deductions from the payroll are voluntary and may be requested by the employee, otherwise, employees are billed 2 mandatory income tax prepayments during the year directly by the tax authority (set at 1/3 of the prior year's final tax bill). Employee payroll tax is made up of assigned taxes for the three branches of the social security system and includes both basic and supplementary coverage. Different percentages apply depending on thresholds that are multiples of the social security earnings ceiling (in 2012 = 36,372 euro per year).

Contributions for salaries between the minimum wage and 1.6 times the minimum wage are eligible to relief (known as Fillon relief) of up to 28 percentage points of employer contributions, effectively halving employer non-wage costs.

Social security contributions
Social Insurance Fund	Employee (Up to cap)	Employee (Over cap)	Employer (Up to cap)	Employer (Over cap)
Medical, Maternity, Invalidity, Death, Solidarity	None		13%	
Family Benefits	None		5.25%	
Old Age Minimum	6.9%	0.4%	8.55%	1.9%
Unemployment	0.95%	None	4.05%	None
Insolvency	None		0.3%	None
Accident	None		Variable	
Autonomy & Solidarity Contribution	None		0.3%	
Pension Supplement	3.1%	1.2%	4.65%	0.8%
Housing Aid	0.5%		0.5%	
General Social Contribution	9.2%		None	
Social Security Debt Reimbursement	0.5%		None	

=== Germany ===
German employers are obliged to withhold wage tax on a monthly basis. The wage tax withheld will be qualified as prepayment of the income tax of the employee in case the taxpayer files an annual income tax return. The actual tax rate depends on the personal income of the employee and the tax class the employee (and his/her partner) has chosen. The choice of tax class is only important for withholding tax, and therefore for immediately disposable income. The choice of tax class has no effect on tax refunds.

In addition to income tax withheld, employees and employers in Germany must pay contributions to finance social security benefits. The social security system consists of four insurances, for which the contribution will be (nearly) equally shared between employer and employee (old age insurance, unemployment insurance, health insurance and nursing care insurance). Contributions are payable only on wages up to the social security threshold:

Annual amounts 2019	Threshold West Germany	Threshold East Germany
Health- and Nursing Care insurance	53,100 Euro	53,100 Euro
Old Age- and Unemployment insurance	78,000 Euro	69,600 Euro

In addition, there are some insurances which are covered by the employee only (accident insurance, insolvency insurance, contribution to the maternity allocation, contribution for sick pay allocation for small companies). The following table shows employee and employer contributions by category for the year 2015.

category	Employee	Employer	Notes
Old Age (pension)	9.35%	9.35%	
Health	7.3%	7.3%	In addition, the health insurance will impose a surcharge up to 0.9%, to be paid by the employee only.
Unemployment	1.5%	1.5%	
Nursing Care	1.175%	1.175%	1.425% childless employees over 23 years old 1.675% in Saxony
Accident		1.6%	depends on risk covered
Sick Pay (AOK, 80%)		0.7%	Depends on coverage and health insurance.
Maternity (AOK)		0.24%	
Insolvency (AOK)		0.15%	Payment of outstanding salary in case of bankruptcy

=== Greece ===
An employer is obligated to deduct tax at source from an employee and to make additional contributions to social security as in many other EU member states. The employer's contribution amounts to 28.06% of the salary. The employee's contribution is 16%.

=== Hong Kong ===
In Hong Kong, salaries tax is capped at 15%. Depending on income, employers fall into different tax brackets.

=== Sweden ===
In 2018, the Swedish social security contribution paid by the employer is 31.42 percent, calculated on top of the employee's salary. The percentage is lower for old employees. The other type of Swedish payroll tax is the income tax withheld (PAYE), which consists of municipal, county, and, for higher income brackets, state tax. In most municipalities, the income tax comes to approximately 32 percent, with the two higher income brackets also paying a state tax of 20 or 25 percent respectively. The combination of the two types is a total marginal tax effect of 52 to 60 percent.

According to a 2019 study in the American Economic Review, a large employee payroll tax cut for young workers did not lead to increases in wages for young workers, but it did lead to an increase in employment, capital, sales, and profits of firms with many young workers.

=== United Kingdom ===
In the United Kingdom, pay as you earn (PAYE) income tax and Employees' National Insurance contributions are examples of the first kind of payroll tax, while Employers' National Insurance contributions are an example of the second kind of payroll tax. There are currently (February 2022) five PAYE income tax bands in Scotland and four elsewhere; see Taxation in the United Kingdom § Personal taxes for details. Both income tax and National Insurance contributions are paid only on income above a lower threshold. This threshold is progressively eliminated for the highest earners, beginning at £100,000 per year.

=== United States ===
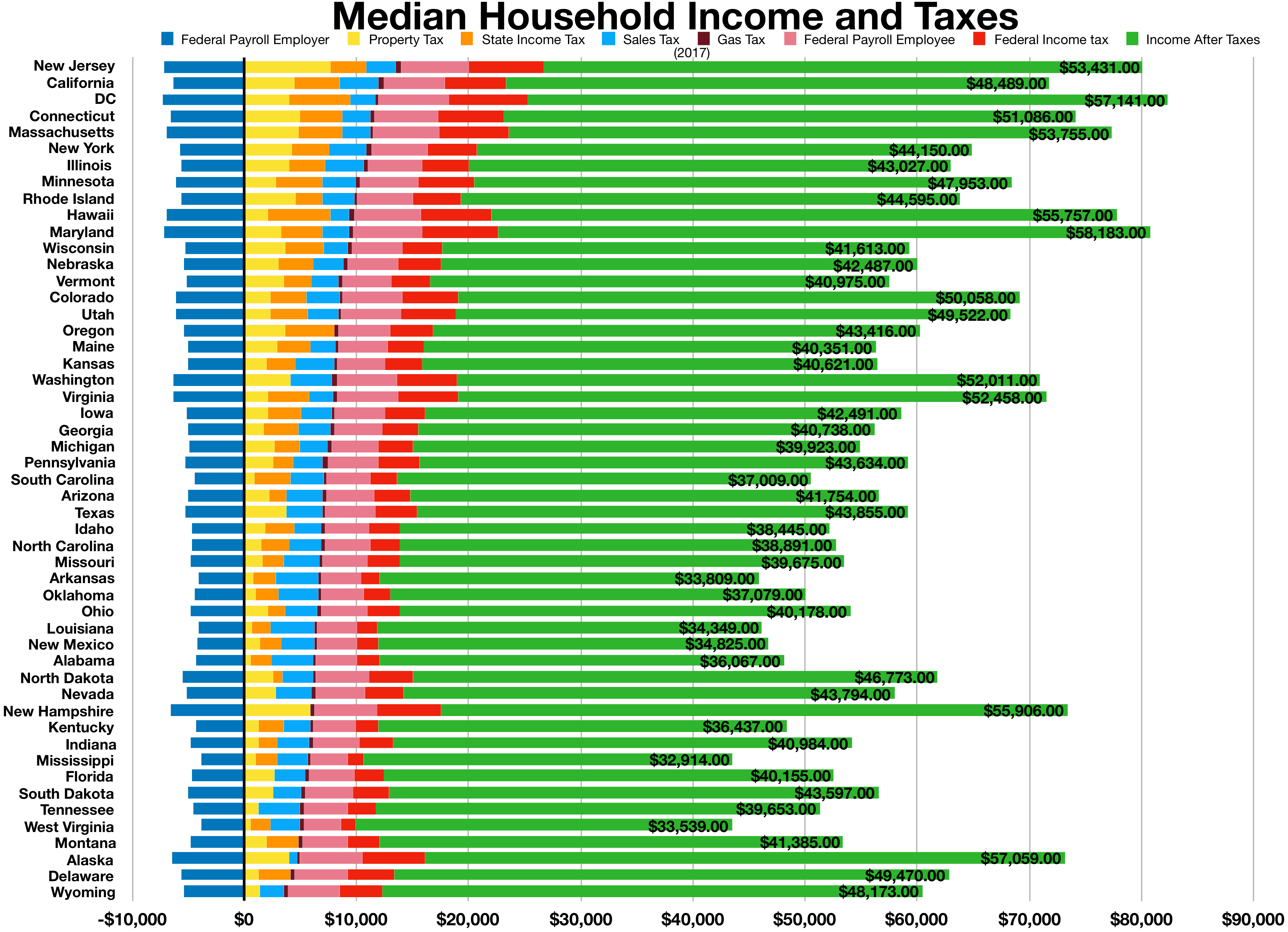
Median household income and taxes

In the United States, payroll taxes are also called employment taxes by the Internal Revenue Service.

In the United States, payroll taxes are assessed by the federal government, some of the 50 states and numerous cities. These taxes are imposed on employers and employees and on various compensation bases and are collected and paid to the taxing jurisdiction by the employers. Most jurisdictions imposing payroll taxes require reporting quarterly and annually in most cases, and electronic reporting is generally required for all but small employers.

==== Social Security and Medicare taxes ====
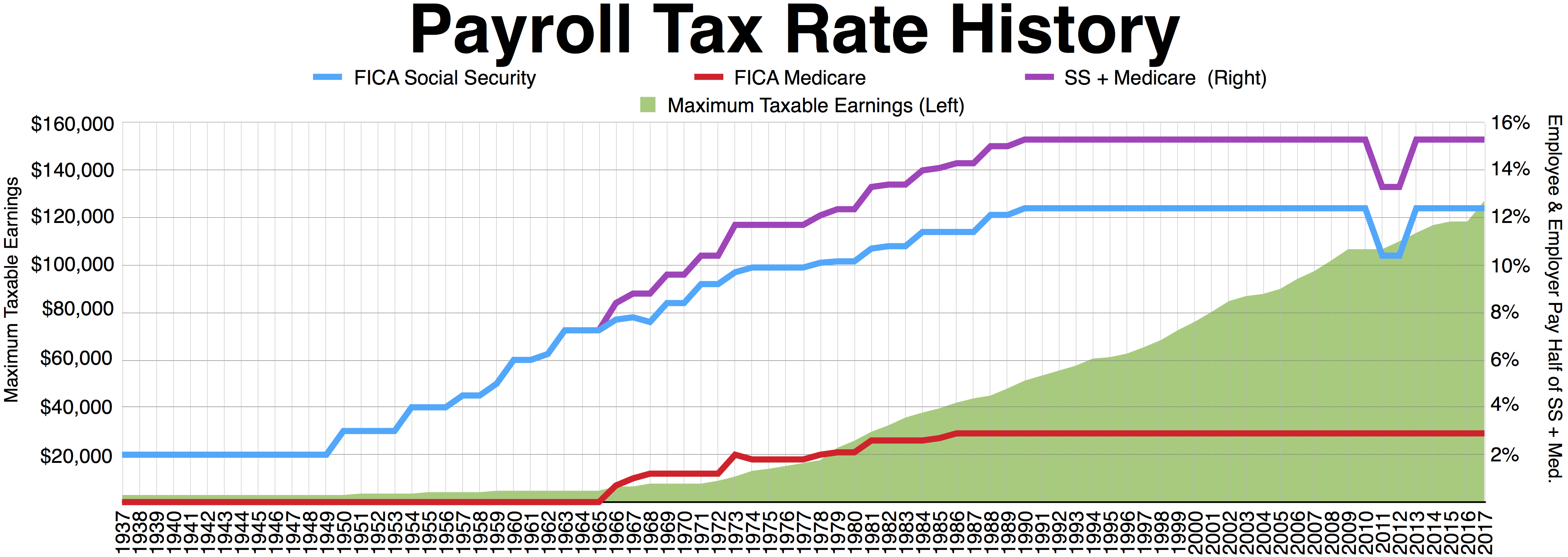
Payroll tax rates history

Federal social insurance taxes are imposed on employers and employees, ordinarily consisting of a tax of 12.4% of wages up to an annual wage maximum ($118,500 in wages, for a maximum contribution of $14,694 in 2016) for Social Security and a tax of 2.9% (half imposed on employer and half withheld from the employee's pay) of all wages for Medicare. The Social Security tax is divided into 6.2% that is visible to employees (the "employee contribution") and 6.2% that is visible only to employers (the "employer's contribution"). For the years 2011 and 2012, the employee's contribution had been temporarily reduced to 4.2%, while the employer's portion remained at 6.2%, but Congress allowed the rate to return to 6.2% for the individual in 2013. To the extent an employee's portion of the 6.2% tax exceeded the maximum by reason of multiple employers, the employee is entitled to a refundable tax credit upon filing an income tax return for the year.

==== Income tax withholding ====
Federal, state, and local withholding taxes are required in those jurisdictions imposing an income tax. Employers having contact with the jurisdiction must withhold the tax from wages paid to their employees in those jurisdictions. Computation of the amount of tax to withhold is performed by the employer based on representations by the employee regarding their tax status on IRS Form W-4.

Amounts of income tax so withheld must be paid to the taxing jurisdiction, and are available as refundable tax credits to the employees. Income taxes withheld from payroll are not final taxes, merely prepayments. Employees must still file income tax returns and self assess tax, claiming amounts withheld as payments.

==== Unemployment taxes ====
Employers are subject to unemployment taxes by the federal and all state governments. The tax is a percentage of taxable wages with a cap. The tax rate and cap vary by jurisdiction and by employer's industry and experience rating. For 2009, the typical maximum tax per employee was under $1,000. Some states also impose unemployment, disability insurance, or similar taxes on employees.

==== Reporting and payment ====
Employers must report payroll taxes to the appropriate taxing jurisdiction in the manner each jurisdiction provides. Quarterly reporting of aggregate income tax withholding and Social Security taxes is required in most jurisdictions. Employers must file reports of aggregate unemployment tax quarterly and annually with each applicable state, and annually at the Federal level.

Each employer is required to provide each employee an annual report on IRS Form W-2 of wages paid and Federal, state and local taxes withheld. A copy must be sent to the IRS, and some state governments also require a copy. These are due by January 31 and February 28 (March 31 if filed electronically), respectively, following the calendar year in which wages are paid. The Form W-2 constitutes proof of payment of tax for the employee.

Employers are required to pay payroll taxes to the taxing jurisdiction under varying rules, in many cases within one banking day. Payment of Federal and many state payroll taxes is required to be made by electronic funds transfer if certain dollar thresholds are met, or by deposit with a bank for the benefit of the taxing jurisdiction.

==== Penalties ====
Failure to timely and properly pay federal payroll taxes results in an automatic penalty of 2% to 10%. This is called the Trust Fund Recovery Penalty. Similar state and local penalties apply. Failure to properly file monthly or quarterly returns may result in additional penalties. Failure to file Forms W-2 results in an automatic penalty of up to $50 per form not timely filed. State and local penalties vary by jurisdiction.

A particularly severe penalty applies where federal income tax withholding and Social Security taxes are not paid to the IRS. The penalty of up to 100% of the amount not paid can be assessed against the employer entity as well as any person (such as a corporate officer) having control or custody of the funds from which payment should have been made.

== See also ==
- List of countries by tax rates
