= Yamakoshi =

Yamakoshi is a surname. Notable people with the surname include:

- Hiyu Yamakoshi (born 2006), Japanese racing driver
- Kohei Yamakoshi (born 1993), Japanese footballer
- Yasuhiro Yamakoshi (born 1985), Japanese footballer
