= Russell Keat =

Political theorist

Russell Keat is a political theorist and retired academic. He was Professor of Political Theory at the University of Edinburgh from 1994 until his retirement in 2006.

== Education and career ==
Keat was educated at the University of Oxford, where he graduated with a BA and then completed a postgraduate BPhil degree. He began lecturing at Lancaster University in 1970 and spent 24 years there, before moving to the University of Edinburgh in 1994 to take up the Chair in Political Theory. He retired in 2006 and since then he has been an emeritus professor at Edinburgh.

According to his departmental profile, Keat's research "is concerned with the ethical character and impact of market institutions, including issues about market boundaries, consumer sovereignty, cultural goods, and varieties of capitalism."

== Publications ==
- (Co-authored with John Urry) Social Theory as Science (Routledge, 1975; 2nd. ed 1982; 3rd ed., 2012).
- The Politics of Social Theory (University of Chicago Press, 1981).
- (Co-authored with Michael Hammond and Jane Howarth) Understanding Phenomenology (Blackwell, 1991).
- (Edited with Nicholas Abercrombie and Nigel Whiteley) Enterprise Culture (Routledge, 1991; 2nd ed., 2012)
- (Edited with Nicholas Abercrombie and Nigel Whiteley) The Authority of the Consumer (Routledge, 1994).
- Cultural Goods and the Limits of the Market (Palgrave, 2000).
