= Keith Soothill =

British criminologist

Keith Leonard Soothill (1941–2014) was a British criminologist, social researcher and academic. He was Professor of Social Research at Lancaster University from 1990 until he retired in 2006.

Soothill was born in Whetstone, London, on 25 March 1941; his father, a salesman, was a WEA tutor. He attended King's College School, Wimbledon, on a scholarship and then worked in advertising before completed a degree in philosophy and psychology at the University of Exeter, graduating in 1965.

He then spent a year as a research assistant at Queen Elizabeth College, London, before working as a researcher at Apex Charitable Trust (1966–69) and then the Institute of Psychiatry (1970–72). In the meantime, he had completed a doctorate at the London School of Economics under the supervision of Terence Morris; his PhD was awarded in 1971 for his thesis "The Apex project: an evaluation of an experimental employment agency for ex-prisoners".

Soothill arrived at Lancaster University as an applied social science lecturer in 1973, and was promoted to senior lecturer in 1978 before being appointed Professor of Social Research in 1990. After retiring in 2006, he remained associated with Lancaster University as an emeritus professor. Soothill died on 12 February 2014, leaving his wife Jennifer and two children.
