= Michael Savage (sociologist) =

British sociologist and academic

Michael Savage, FBA (born 20 June 1959) is a British sociologist and academic, specialising in social class. Since 2014 he has been the Martin White Professor of Sociology at the London School of Economics and Political Science (LSE), the post traditionally awarded to the most senior professor in the department. In addition to being Head of the Sociology Department between 2013 and 2016, Savage also held the position of Director of LSE's International Inequalities Institute between 2015 and 2020. He previously taught at the University of Manchester and the University of York.

== Honours ==
In 2007, Savage was elected a Fellow of the British Academy (FBA), the United Kingdom's national academy for the humanities and social sciences.

== Selected works ==
- Savage, Mike (1987). The Dynamics of Working-Class Politics: The Labour Movement in Preston, 1880–1940. Cambridge: Cambridge University Press.
- Savage, Mike; Barlow, James; Dickens, Peter; Fielding, Tony (1992). Property, Bureaucracy and Culture: Middle-Class Formation in Contemporary Britain. London: Routledge.
- Savage, Mike; Witz, Anne (eds.) (1992). Gender and Bureaucracy. Oxford: Blackwell.
- Savage, Mike; Warde, Alan (1993). Urban Sociology, Capitalism and Modernity (1st ed.). Basingstoke: Macmillan. ISBN 978-0333491638.
- Savage, Mike; Miles, Andrew (1994). The Remaking of the British Working Class, 1840–1940. London: Routledge.
- Butler, Tim; Savage, Mike (eds.) (1995). Social Change and the Middle Classes. London: UCL Press.
- Halford, Susan; Savage, Mike; Witz, Anne (eds.) (1997). Gender, Careers and Organizations: Current Developments in Banking, Nursing and Local Government. London: Macmillan.
- Savage, Mike (2000). Class Analysis and Social Transformation. Open University Press.
- Savage, Mike; Naidoo, Prem (eds.) (2002). Popularisation of Science and Technology Education: Some Case Studies from South Africa. London: Commonwealth Secretariat.
- Savage, Mike; Warde, Alan; Ward, Kevin (2003). Urban Sociology, Capitalism and Modernity (2nd ed.). New York, NY: Palgrave Macmillan. ISBN 978-0333971604.
- Devine, Fiona; Savage, Mike; Scott, John; Crompton, Rosemary (2005). Rethinking class: culture, identities and lifestyles. Basingstoke, Hampshire New York: Palgrave Macmillan. ISBN 978-0333968956.
- Savage, Mike; Bagnall, Gaynor; Longhurst, Brian (2005). Globalization and Belonging. London: Sage.
- Blokland, Talja; Savage, Mike (2008). Networked Urbanism: Social Capital in the City. Ashgate.
- Savage, Mike; Williams, Karel (eds.) (2008). Remembering Elites. Oxford: Blackwell.
- Bennett, Tony; Savage, Mike; Silva, Elizabeth; Warde, Alan; Gayo-Cal, Modesto; Wright, David (eds.) (2009). Culture, Class, Distinction. Abingdon: Routledge.
- Savage, Mike (2010). Identities and Social Change in Britain since 1940: The Politics of Method. Oxford: Oxford University Press. ISBN 978-0199587650.
- Atkinson, Will; Roberts, Steven; Savage, Mike (eds.) (2012). Class Inequality in Austerity Britain: Power, Difference and Suffering. Basingstoke: Palgrave Macmillan.
- Wolff, Janet; Savage, Mike (eds.) (2013). Culture in Manchester: Institutions and Urban Change since 1850. Manchester: Manchester University Press.
- Savage, Mike (2015). Social Class in the 21st Century. London: Pelican Books. ISBN 978-0241004227.
- Hanquinet, Laurie; Savage, Mike (eds.) (2016). Routledge International Handbook of the Sociology of Art and Culture. Abingdon: Routledge.
- Korsnes, Olav; Heilbron, Johan; Hjellbrekke, Johs.; Bühlmann, Felix; Savage, Mike (eds.) (2017). New Directions in Elite Studies. Routledge.
- The Return of Inequality. Social Change and the Weight of the Past. Cambridge / Mass.: Harvard University Press. 2021.
