= Social Security Administration =

Independent agency of the U.S. federal government

United States Social Security Administration
- Seal

- Flag

Agency overview
- Formed: August 14, 1935; 91 years ago
- Jurisdiction: Federal government of the United States
- Headquarters: Woodlawn, Maryland, U.S.
- Employees: 49,450
- Annual budget: $49.448 billion (FY 2026)
- Agency executives: Frank Bisignano, Commissioner; Arjun Mody, Deputy Commissioner
- Key documents: 42 U.S.C. § 901; Social Security Act
- Website: ssa.gov

The United States Social Security Administration (SSA) is an independent agency of the U.S. federal government that administers Social Security, a social insurance program consisting of retirement, disability and survivor benefits. The Social Security Administration was established by the Social Security Act of 1935 and is codified in 42 U.S.C. § 901 (49 Stat. 635). It was created in 1935 as the "Social Security Board", then assumed its present name in 1946. Its current leader is Commissioner Frank Bisignano.

SSA delivers its programs and services online, by phone, by video, and in person through a network of more than 1,500 offices nationwide, including over 1,200 field offices. The agency also provides service through its National 800 Number. Field offices, which historically serve tens of millions of visitors annually, were reopened on April 7, 2022, following pandemic-related closures.

SSA is headquartered in Woodlawn, Maryland, west of Baltimore, at its Central Office campus. As of 2026, SSA employed approximately 50,000 Federal employees and funded about 13,700 State DDS employees. Headquarters non-supervisory employees of SSA are represented by American Federation of Government Employees Local 1923.

SSA administers the Nation’s largest Federal social insurance programs. In FY 2027, SSA will pay approximately $1.83 trillion in Old-Age and Survivors Insurance (OASI), Disability Insurance (DI), and Supplemental Security Income (SSI) benefits. Federal SSI payments are estimated at $69.7 billion.

To qualify for most of these benefits, most workers pay Social Security taxes on their earnings; the claimant's benefits are based on the wage earner's contributions. Otherwise benefits such as Supplemental Security Income (SSI) are given based on need. SSA also maintains more than 300 million active Social Security numbers, serving as the Nation’s primary personal identifier.

== History ==
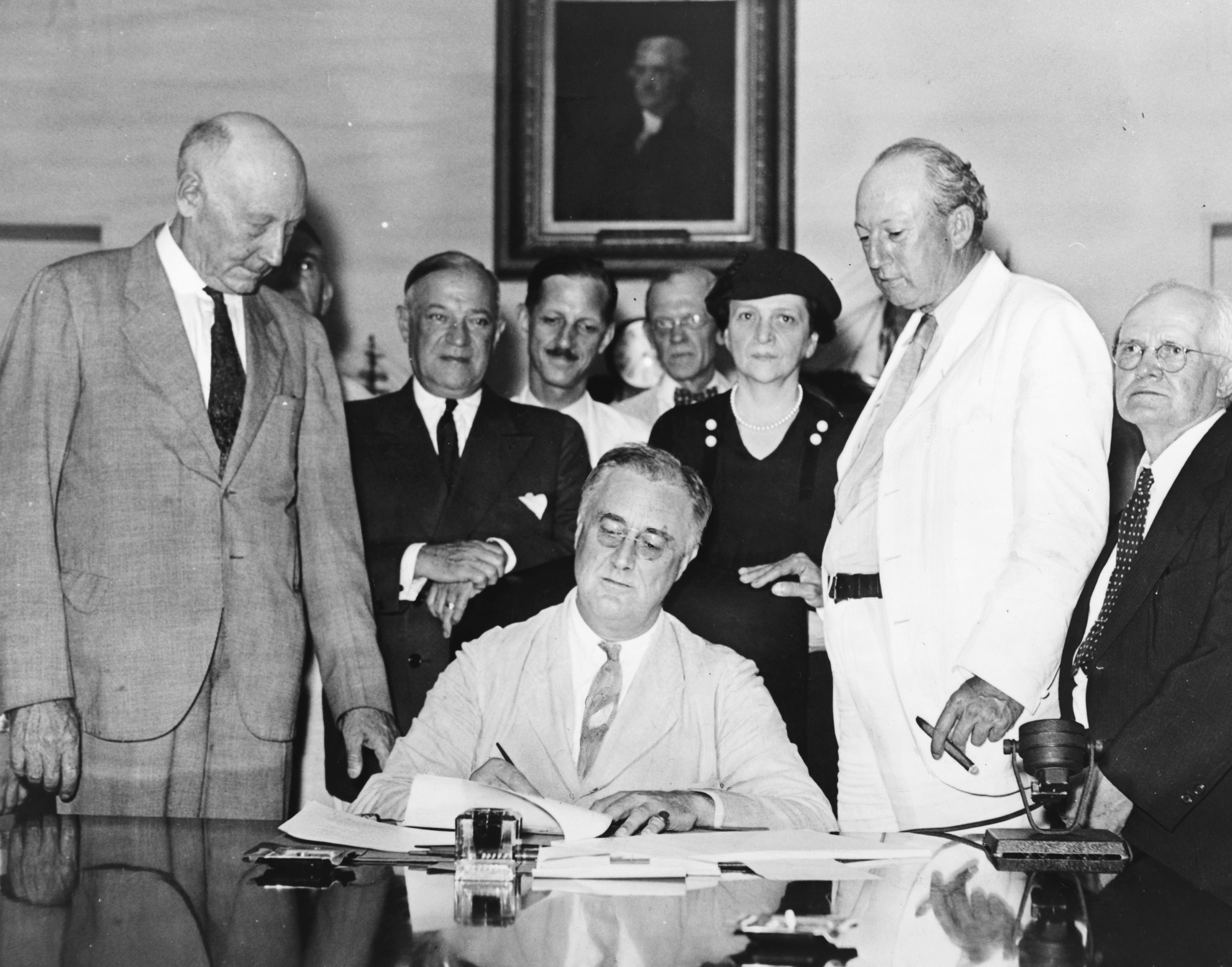
President Franklin D. Roosevelt signs the Social Security Act of 1935 into law (August 14, 1935).

The Social Security Act created a Social Security Board (SSB), to oversee the administration of the new program. It was created as part of President Franklin D. Roosevelt's New Deal with the signing of the Social Security Act of 1935 on August 14, 1935. The Board consisted of three presidentially appointed executives, and started with no budget, no staff, and no furniture. It obtained a temporary budget from the Federal Emergency Relief Administration headed by Harry Hopkins. The first counsel for the new agency was Thomas Elliott, one of Felix Frankfurter's "happy hot dogs".

The first Social Security office opened in Austin, Texas, on October 14, 1936. Social Security taxes were first collected in January 1937, along with the first one-time, lump-sum payments. The first person to receive monthly retirement benefits was Ida May Fuller of Brattleboro, Vermont. Her first check, dated January 31, 1940, was in the amount of US$22.54.

In 1939, the Social Security Board merged into a cabinet-level Federal Security Agency, which included the SSB, the U.S. Public Health Service, the Civilian Conservation Corps, and other agencies. In January 1940, the first regular ongoing monthly benefits began.In 1946, the SSB was renamed the Social Security Administration under President Harry S. Truman's Reorganization Plan.

In 1953, the Federal Security Agency was abolished and SSA was placed under the Department of Health, Education, and Welfare, which became the Department of Health and Human Services in 1980. In 1994, Congress amended non-positive law 42 U.S.C. § 901 and returned SSA to the status of an independent agency in the executive branch of government. In 1972, Cost of Living Adjustments (COLAs) were introduced into SSA programs to deal with the effects of inflation on fixed incomes.

In 1960, the Supreme Court ruled in Flemming v. Nestor that the Social Security is not a system of 'accrued property rights' and that those who pay into the system have no contractual right to receive what they have paid into it.

In April 2025, the Social Security Administration, under the Trump administration, falsely listed over 6,000 living immigrants in their database of dead people, which was a change implemented by acting commissioner Leland Dudek and Homeland Security Secretary Kristi Noem, with the support of the Department of Government Efficiency, reported The Washington Post. The newspaper also reported that the Trump administration ejected Social Security Administration senior executive Greg Pearre from his office and put him on leave after he objected to the false listings as illegal and cruel. In August 2025, a whistleblower filed a complaint that DOGE uploaded a database of Americans' sensitive Social Security information to an unsecured server, compromising the data of millions of people. A few days later, the whistleblower, the agency's chief data officer, submitted a resignation that he described as "involuntary" after being subjected to an alleged hostile work environment.

Over the course of 2025, Social Security Administration staffing levels dropped by roughly 7500 workers, 13% of the total workforce. This constituted the largest one-year staffing drop in the agency's history.. The administration also made an effort to move more services online, announcing a goal of cutting field office visits in half (from 31 million to 15 million visits) in fiscal year 2026 Researchers found that these changes made the process of claiming SSI and SSDI benefits significantly more difficult.

== Historical leadership ==
Denotes acting capacity.

=== SSB chairs ===
| No. | Image | Name | Start | End | Notes | President |
|---|---|---|---|---|---|---|
| 1 | | John Winant | August 23, 1935 | September 30, 1936 | | Franklin D. Roosevelt (1933–1945) |
| – | | Arthur Altmeyer; Acting | September 30, 1936 | November 16, 1936 | | Franklin D. Roosevelt (1933–1945) |
| 1 | | John Winant | November 16, 1936 | February 19, 1937 | | Franklin D. Roosevelt (1933–1945) |
| 2 | | Arthur Altmeyer | February 19, 1937 | July 16, 1946 | | Franklin D. Roosevelt (1933–1945) |
| 2 | | Arthur Altmeyer | February 19, 1937 | July 16, 1946 | | Harry S. Truman (1945–1953) |

=== SSA commissioners ===
| No. | Image | Name | Start | End | Notes | President |
|---|---|---|---|---|---|---|
| 1 | | Arthur Altmeyer | July 16, 1946 | April 10, 1953 | | Harry S. Truman (1945–1953) |
| 1 | | Arthur Altmeyer | July 16, 1946 | April 10, 1953 | | Dwight D. Eisenhower (1953–1961) |
| – | | William Mitchell; Acting | April 11, 1953 | November 23, 1953 | | Dwight D. Eisenhower (1953–1961) |
| 2 | | John Tramburg | November 24, 1953 | July 31, 1954 | | Dwight D. Eisenhower (1953–1961) |
| 3 | | Charles Schottland | August 23, 1954 | December 31, 1958 | | Dwight D. Eisenhower (1953–1961) |
| 4 | | William Mitchell | February 4, 1959 | April 3, 1962 | | Dwight D. Eisenhower (1953–1961) |
| 4 | | William Mitchell | February 4, 1959 | April 3, 1962 | | John F. Kennedy (1961–1963) |
| 5 | | Bob Ball | April 17, 1962 | March 17, 1973 | | John F. Kennedy (1961–1963) |
| 5 | | Bob Ball | April 17, 1962 | March 17, 1973 | | Lyndon B. Johnson (1963–1969) |
| 5 | | Bob Ball | April 17, 1962 | March 17, 1973 | | Richard Nixon (1969–1974) |
| – | | Arthur Hess; Acting | March 18, 1973 | October 24, 1973 | | Richard Nixon (1969–1974) |
| 6 | | James Cardwell | October 25, 1973 | December 12, 1977 | | Richard Nixon (1969–1974) |
| 6 | | James Cardwell | October 25, 1973 | December 12, 1977 | | Gerald Ford (1974–1977) |
| 6 | | James Cardwell | October 25, 1973 | December 12, 1977 | | Jimmy Carter (1977–1981) |
| – | | Don Wortman; Acting | December 13, 1977 | October 4, 1978 | | Jimmy Carter (1977–1981) |
| 7 | | Stanford Ross | October 5, 1978 | December 31, 1979 | | Jimmy Carter (1977–1981) |
| – | | Herb Doggette; Acting | January 1, 1980 | January 2, 1980 | | Jimmy Carter (1977–1981) |
| 8 | | William Driver | January 3, 1980 | January 19, 1981 | | Jimmy Carter (1977–1981) |
| – | | Herb Doggette; Acting | January 20, 1981 | May 5, 1981 | | Ronald Reagan (1981–1989) |
| 9 | | John Svahn | May 6, 1981 | September 12, 1983 | | Ronald Reagan (1981–1989) |
| – | | Martha McSteen; Acting | September 14, 1983 | June 25, 1986 | | Ronald Reagan (1981–1989) |
| 10 | | Dorcas Hardy | June 26, 1986 | July 31, 1989 | | Ronald Reagan (1981–1989) |
| 10 | | Dorcas Hardy | June 26, 1986 | July 31, 1989 | | George H. W. Bush (1989–1993) |
| 11 | | Gwendolyn King | August 1, 1989 | September 30, 1992 | | George H. W. Bush (1989–1993) |
| – | | Lou Enoff; Acting | October 1, 1992 | July 18, 1993 | | George H. W. Bush (1989–1993) |
| – | | Lou Enoff; Acting | October 1, 1992 | July 18, 1993 | | Bill Clinton (1993–2001) |
| – | | Lawrence Thompson; Acting | July 19, 1993 | October 7, 1993 | | Bill Clinton (1993–2001) |
| 12 | | Shirley Chater | October 8, 1993 | February 28, 1997 | | Bill Clinton (1993–2001) |
| – | | John Callahan; Acting | March 1, 1997 | September 28, 1997 | | Bill Clinton (1993–2001) |
| 13 | | Ken Apfel | September 29, 1997 | January 20, 2001 | | Bill Clinton (1993–2001) |
| – | | Bill Halter; Acting | January 21, 2001 | March 28, 2001 | | George W. Bush (2001–2009) |
| – | | Larry Massanari; Acting | March 29, 2001 | November 9, 2001 | | George W. Bush (2001–2009) |
| 14 | | Jo Anne Barnhart | November 9, 2001 | January 19, 2007 | | George W. Bush (2001–2009) |
| – | | Linda S. McMahon; Acting | January 20, 2007 | February 11, 2007 | | George W. Bush (2001–2009) |
| 15 | | Michael Astrue | February 12, 2007 | January 19, 2013 | | George W. Bush (2001–2009) |
| 15 | | Michael Astrue | February 12, 2007 | January 19, 2013 | | Barack Obama (2009–2017) |
| – | | Carolyn Colvin; Acting | January 19, 2013 | January 20, 2017 | | Barack Obama (2009–2017) |
| – | | Nancy Berryhill; Acting | January 21, 2017 | June 17, 2019 | | Donald Trump (2017–2021) |
| 16 | | Andrew Saul | June 17, 2019 | July 9, 2021 | | Donald Trump (2017–2021) |
| 16 | | Andrew Saul | June 17, 2019 | July 9, 2021 | | Joe Biden (2021–2025) |
| – | | Kilolo Kijakazi; Acting | July 9, 2021 | December 20, 2023 | | Joe Biden (2021–2025) |
| 17 | | Martin O'Malley | December 20, 2023 | November 29, 2024 | | Joe Biden (2021–2025) |
| – | | Carolyn Colvin; Acting | November 30, 2024 | January 20, 2025 | | Joe Biden (2021–2025) |
| – | | Michelle King; Acting | January 20, 2025 | February 16, 2025 | | Donald Trump (2025–present) |
| – | | Leland Dudek; Acting | February 16, 2025 | May 7, 2025 | | Donald Trump (2025–present) |
| 18 | | Frank Bisignano | May 7, 2025 | Incumbent | | Donald Trump (2025–present) |

== Headquarters ==
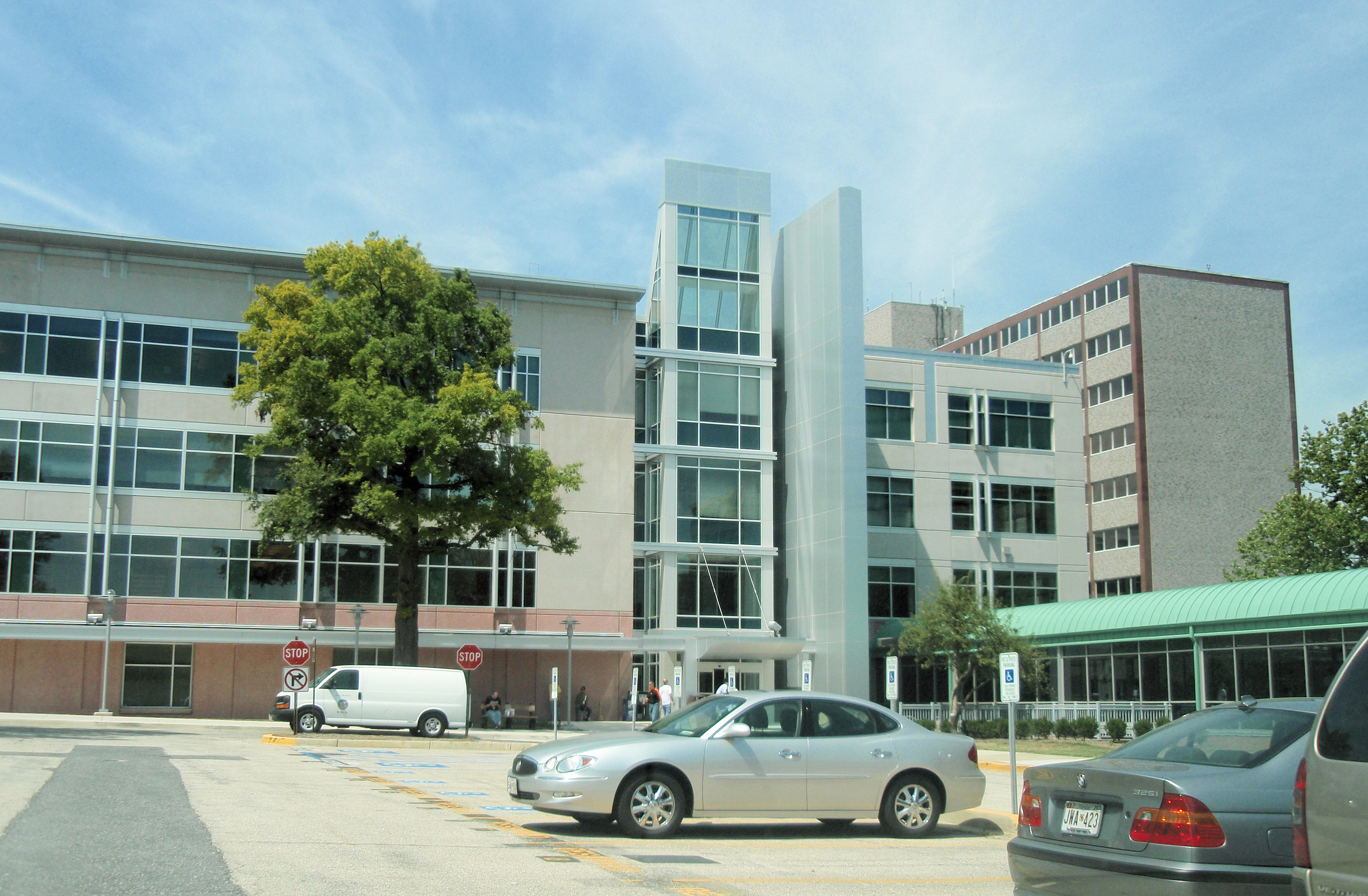
One part of SSA headquarters in Woodlawn, Maryland

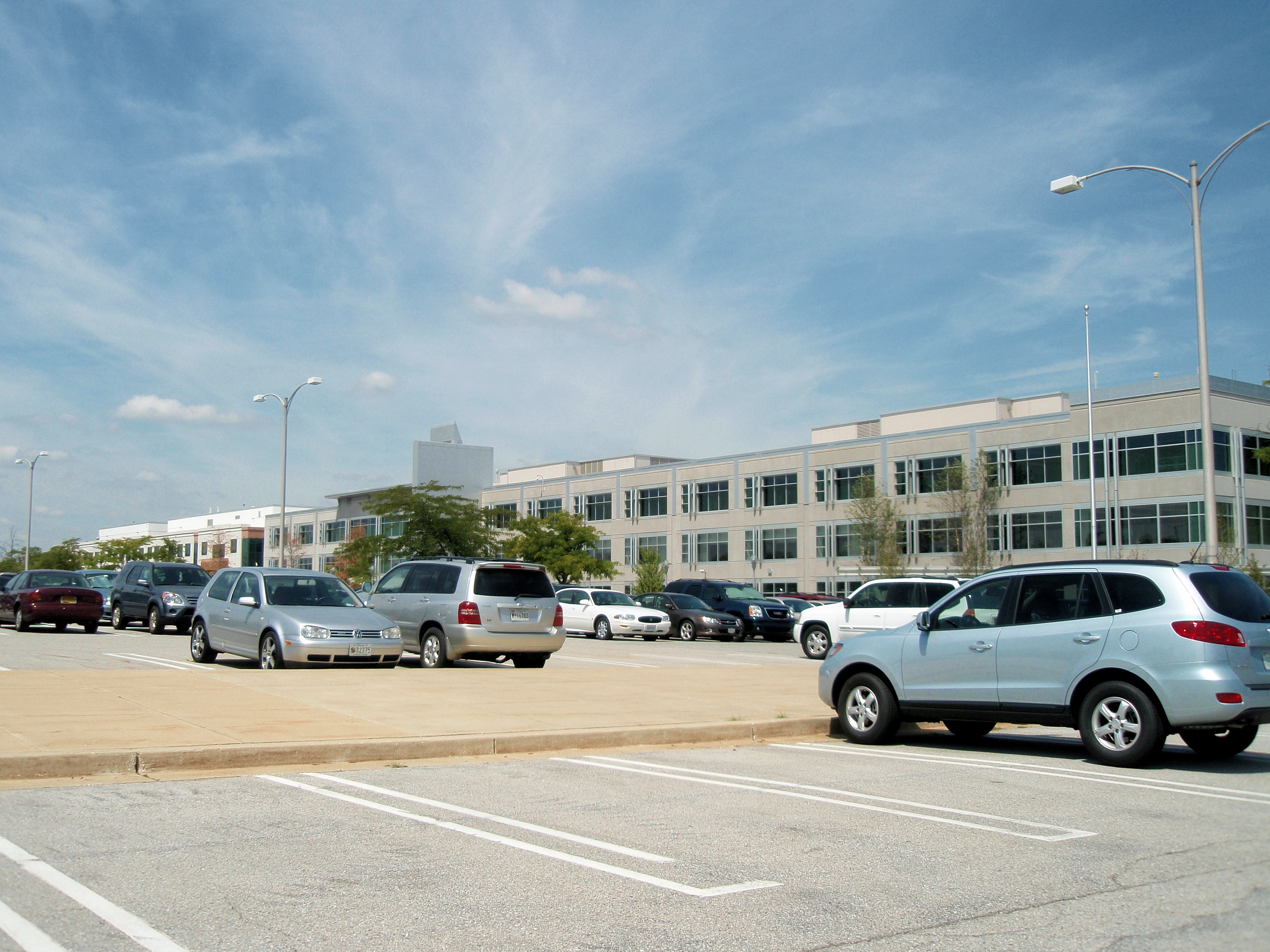
Another view of SSA headquarters in Maryland

SSA was one of the first federal agencies to have its national headquarters outside of Washington, D.C., or its adjacent suburbs. It was located in Baltimore initially due to the need for a building that was capable of holding the unprecedented amount of paper records that would be needed. Nothing suitable was available in Washington in 1936, so the Social Security Board selected the Candler Building on Baltimore's harbor as a temporary location. Soon after locating there, construction began on a permanent building for SSA in Washington that would meet their requirements for record storage capacity. However, by the time the new building was completed, World War II had started, and the building was commandeered by the War Department. By the time the war ended, it was judged too disruptive to relocate the agency to Washington. The Agency remained in the Candler Building until 1960, when it relocated to its newly built headquarters in Woodlawn.

The road on which the headquarters is located, built especially for SSA, is named Security Boulevard (Maryland Route 122) and has since become one of the major arteries connecting Baltimore with its western suburbs. Security Boulevard is also the name of SSA's exit from the nearby Baltimore Beltway (Interstate 695). A nearby shopping center has been named Security Square Mall, and Woodlawn is often referred to informally as "Security." Interstate 70, which runs for thousands of miles from Utah to Maryland, terminates in a park and ride lot that adjoins the SSA campus.

Due to space constraints and ongoing renovations, many headquarters employees work in leased space throughout the Woodlawn area. Other SSA components are located elsewhere. For example, the headquarters (also known as Central Office) of SSA's Office of Disability Adjudication and Review is located in Falls Church, Virginia.

== Field offices ==
SSA has a network of more than 1,200 community-based field offices. In fiscal year 2019, 43 million individuals visited these field offices to apply for benefits, get an original or replacement Social Security card, or receive other services. Field offices reopened in April 2022, after being closed for two years due to the COVID-19 pandemic.

SSA provides a field office locator service, where members of the public can find office phone numbers and addresses.

SSA also provides services through a national toll-free number (1-800-772-1213) and a website. Retirement and disability benefits can be applied for online. For survivor benefits, however, members of the public must call or visit SSA in person to apply. In most states, individuals seeking a replacement Social Security card can apply for one online.

Members of the public can also apply for Supplemental Security Income at SSA's field offices. Field office staff will also assist SSI applicants with an application for food assistance through the SNAP program.

== Program Service Centers ==
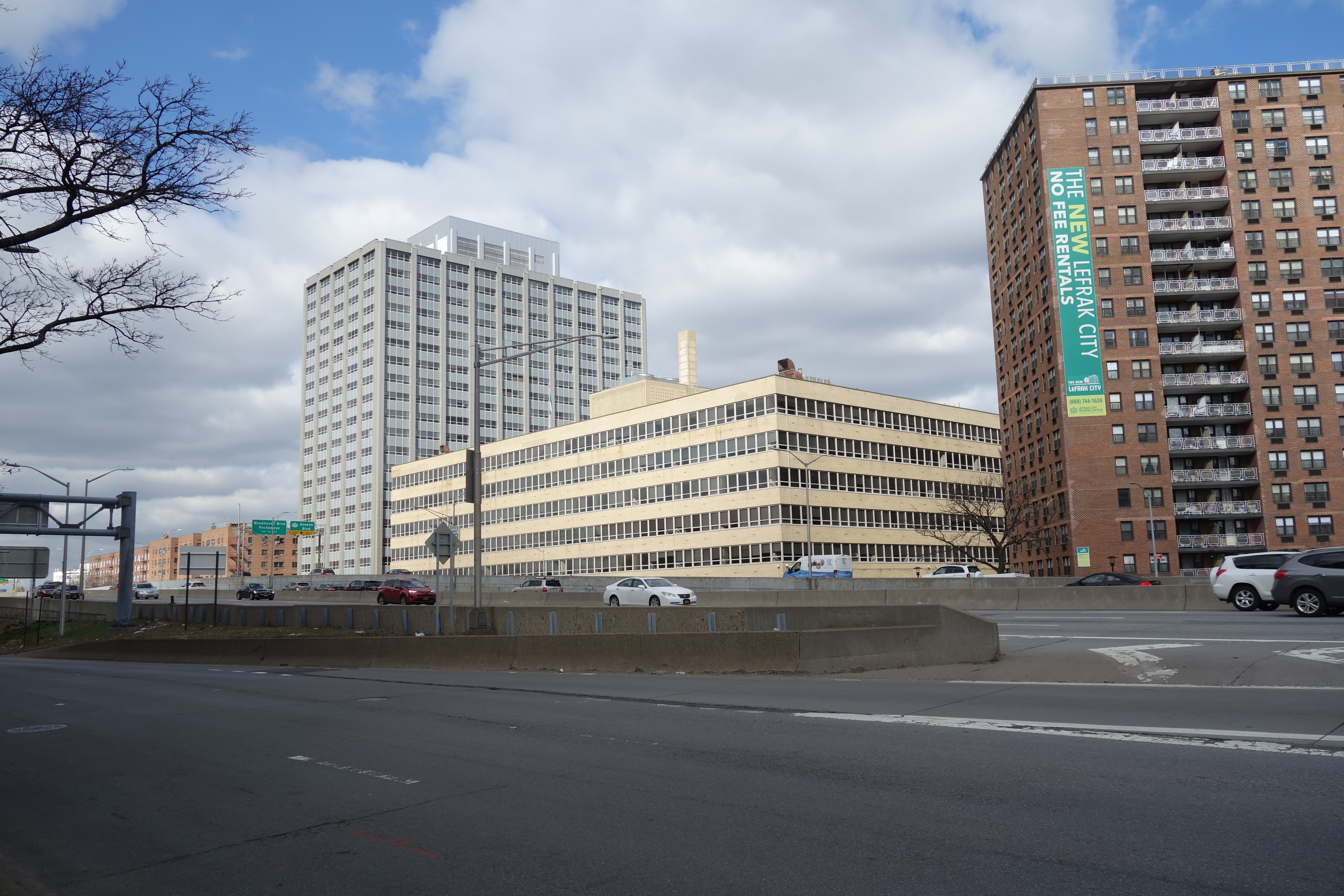
The two buildings in the center, part of Lefrak City in Rego Park, Queens, housed the Northeastern Program Service Center until ...

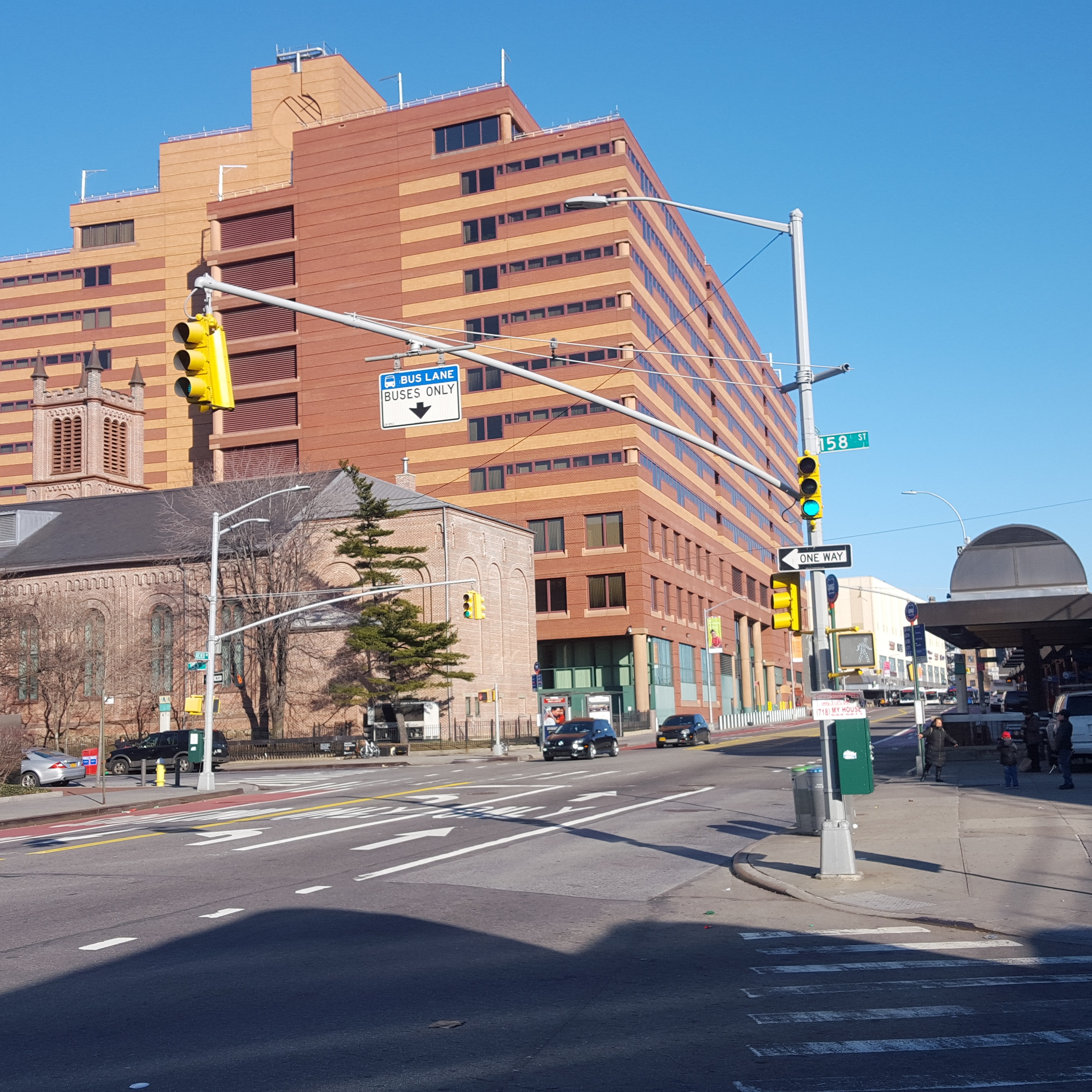
... it was moved to the Joseph P. Addabbo Federal Building in Jamaica, Queens, in the late 1980s.

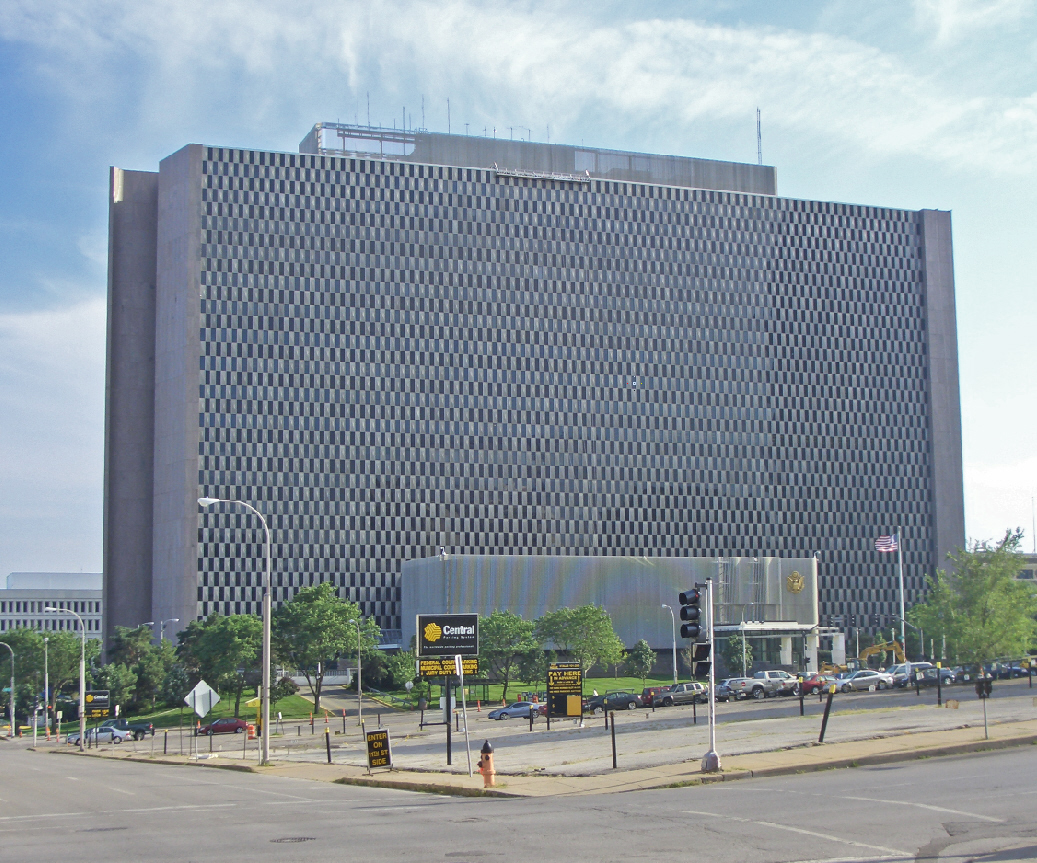
The Mid-America Program Service Center is housed in the Richard Bolling Federal Building in Kansas City, Missouri.

Much of the actual processing of initial benefits and subsequent adjustments to benefits is done in six large Program Service Centers located around the country.

The two main positions in Program Service Centers have long been Claims Authorizers and Benefits Authorizers. Claims Authorizers, now sometimes called claims specialists, establish initial benefits for program recipients. Benefits Authorizers process complicated changes of entitlements to existing beneficiaries, including life events, overpayments, underpayments, and so forth. The claims position is the higher-ranking of the two and initially required a college degree whereas the post-entitlement position did not. For decades, post-entitlement actions have been processed through a system known as Manual Adjustment, Credit and Award Processes (MADCAP).

The six service centers are:

- Northeastern Program Service Center, Jamaica, Queens, New York (as of late 1980s; previously in Rego Park, Queens and College Point, Queens)
- Mid-Atlantic Program Service Center, Philadelphia, Pennsylvania
- Southeastern Program Service Center, Birmingham, Alabama
- Great Lakes Program Service Center, Chicago, Illinois
- Mid-America Program Service Center, Kansas City, Missouri
- Western Program Service Center, Richmond, California (as of mid 1970s; previously in San Francisco)

They have been located in these six cities going back to at least the early 1950s. The origins of the payment centers date back to 1942, when they were known as Area Offices. The first one was established in Philadelphia, with ones in New York, Chicago, San Francisco, and New Orleans, Louisiana, soon following.

In addition, there are specialized processing centers for the Office of Earnings and International Operations and the Office of Disability Operations, both located in Baltimore.

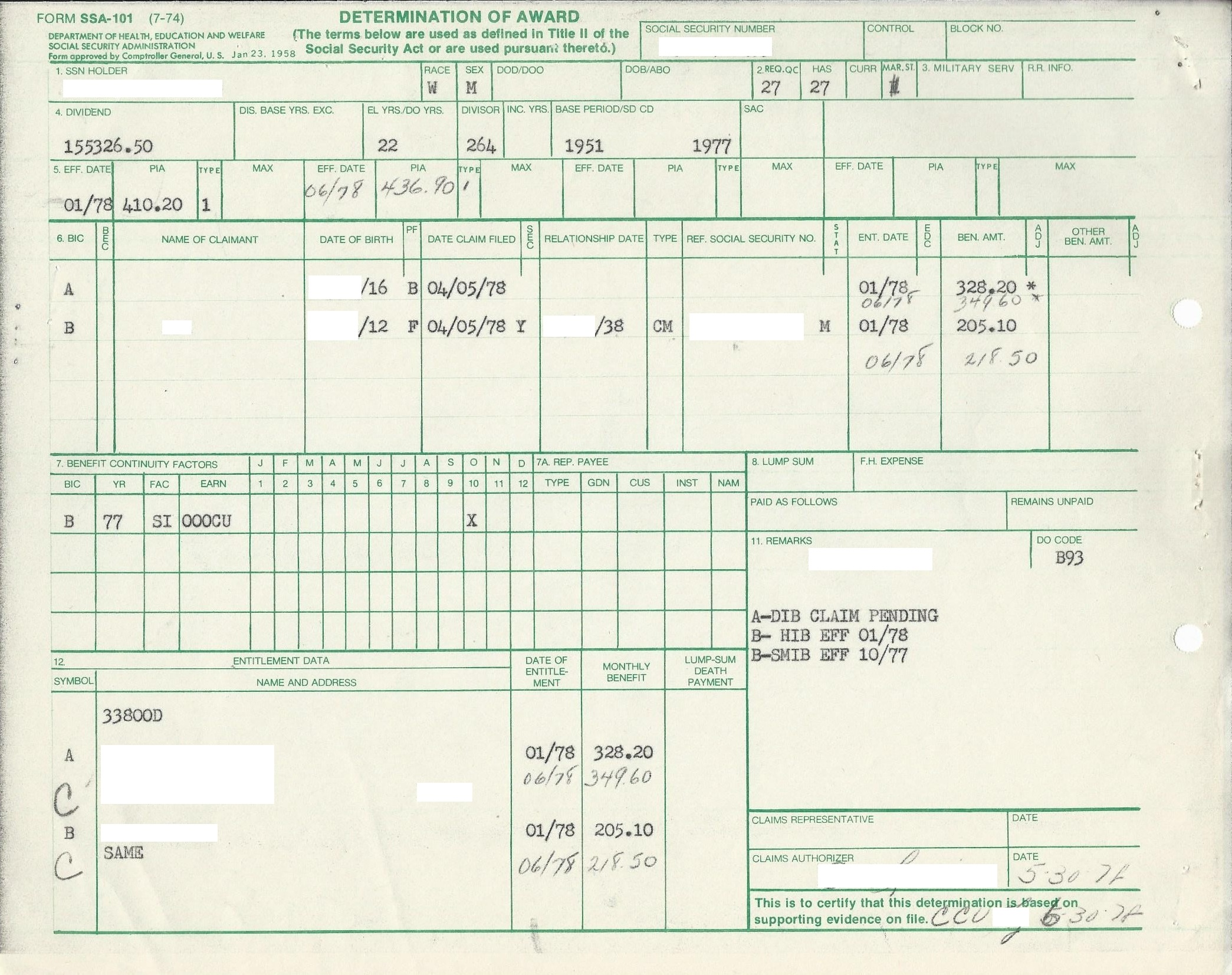
Form SSA-101 was the central form used in Program Services Centers for indicating initial entitlement to benefits.

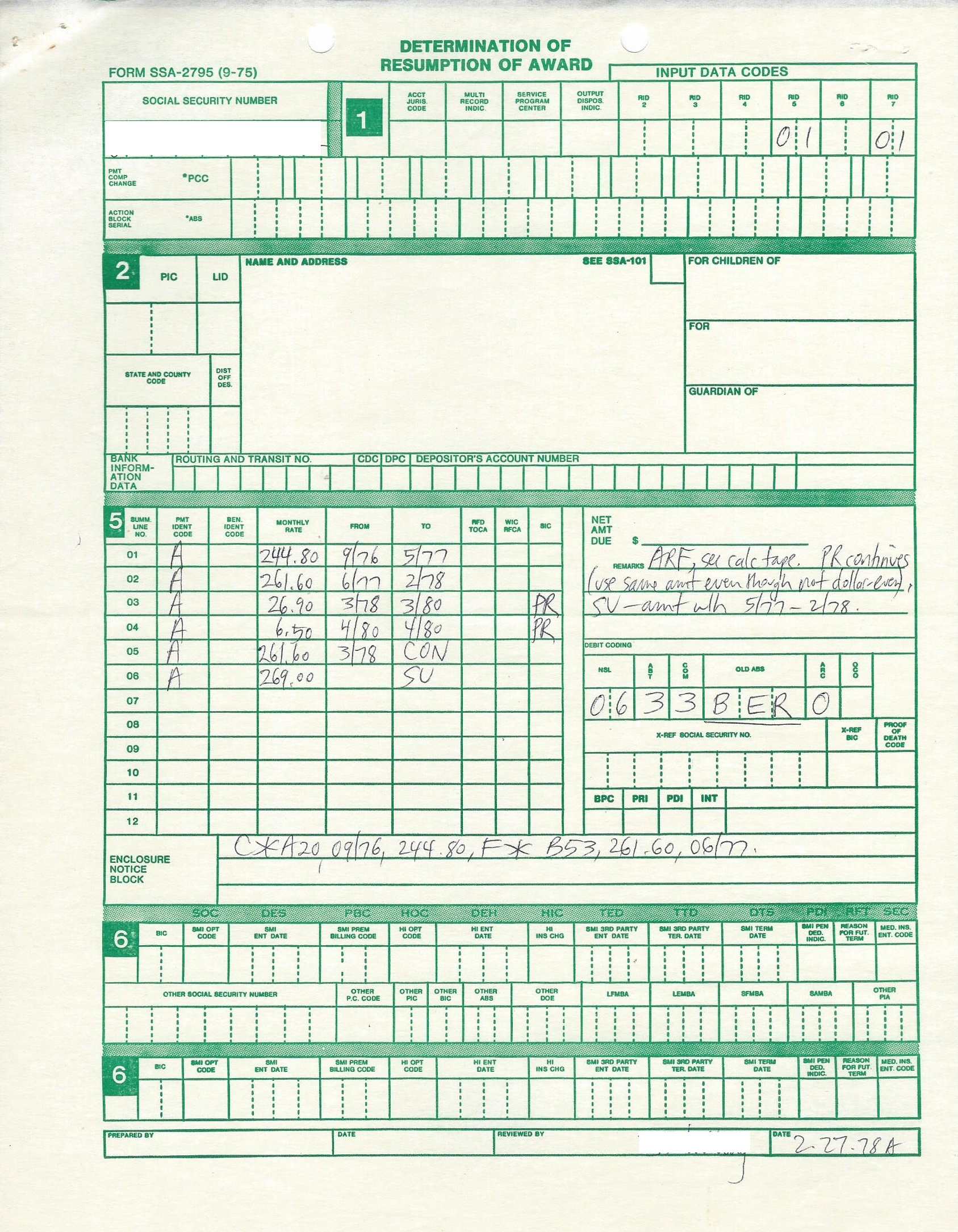
Form SSA-2795 was the central form used in Program Services Centers for changing entitlements to benefits.

Before the mid-1970s, the Program Service Centers were called Payment Centers. By the late 1960s, the Payment Centers had acquired a reputation as sources of poor bureaucratic performance that people did not want to work in, and a reorganization under a modules system was undertaken during the 1970s in an effort to improve matters. Each module would be assigned a certain block of social security numbers and it would process all aspects of a claim, from initial entitlement through various changes, notifications to beneficiaries, and so forth. Decades later, the modules system was still seen as one of the great improvements in SSA processing.

The centers have each employed around two thousand people or more, giving them a major local economic impact, and even relocations within the same metropolitan area have created political conflict. When in the early 1970s, SSA and the General Services Administration said it intended to move payment center operations out of San Francisco and across the East Bay to Richmond, the move was opposed by San Francisco-representing Congressman Phillip Burton. Burton's efforts were in vain, however, as construction in a redevelopment area in Richmond commenced and the move was made around 1975.

Similarly, in the late 1970s, SSA, the General Services Administration, and the Carter administration devised a plan to move the program service center from its main location, in two leased buildings on Horace Harding Expressway in Lefrak City in Rego Park, to a new federal building planned for a revitalization zone in the center of the Jamaica area of Queens. The move was championed by Congressman Joseph P. Addabbo, who represented Jamaica and whose district would gain the over 2,000 federal workers involved, but was opposed by Congressman Benjamin Rosenthal, whose district would lose them. According to Rosenthal, the potential negative impact of the move affected the Elmhurst and Corona neighborhoods most strongly. The move was also supported by Representative Geraldine Ferraro, another powerful Queens figure, who sat on the House Public Works Committee.The dispute was aired in Congressional hearings and embroiled Senator Daniel Patrick Moynihan and developer Richard Lefrak, supporting and opposing the move respectively, as well. In the event, the move went forward and the new, 11-story building in Jamaica – by then named the Joseph P. Addabbo Federal Building, as the congressman had died in the interim – opened in 1988.

== Coverage ==
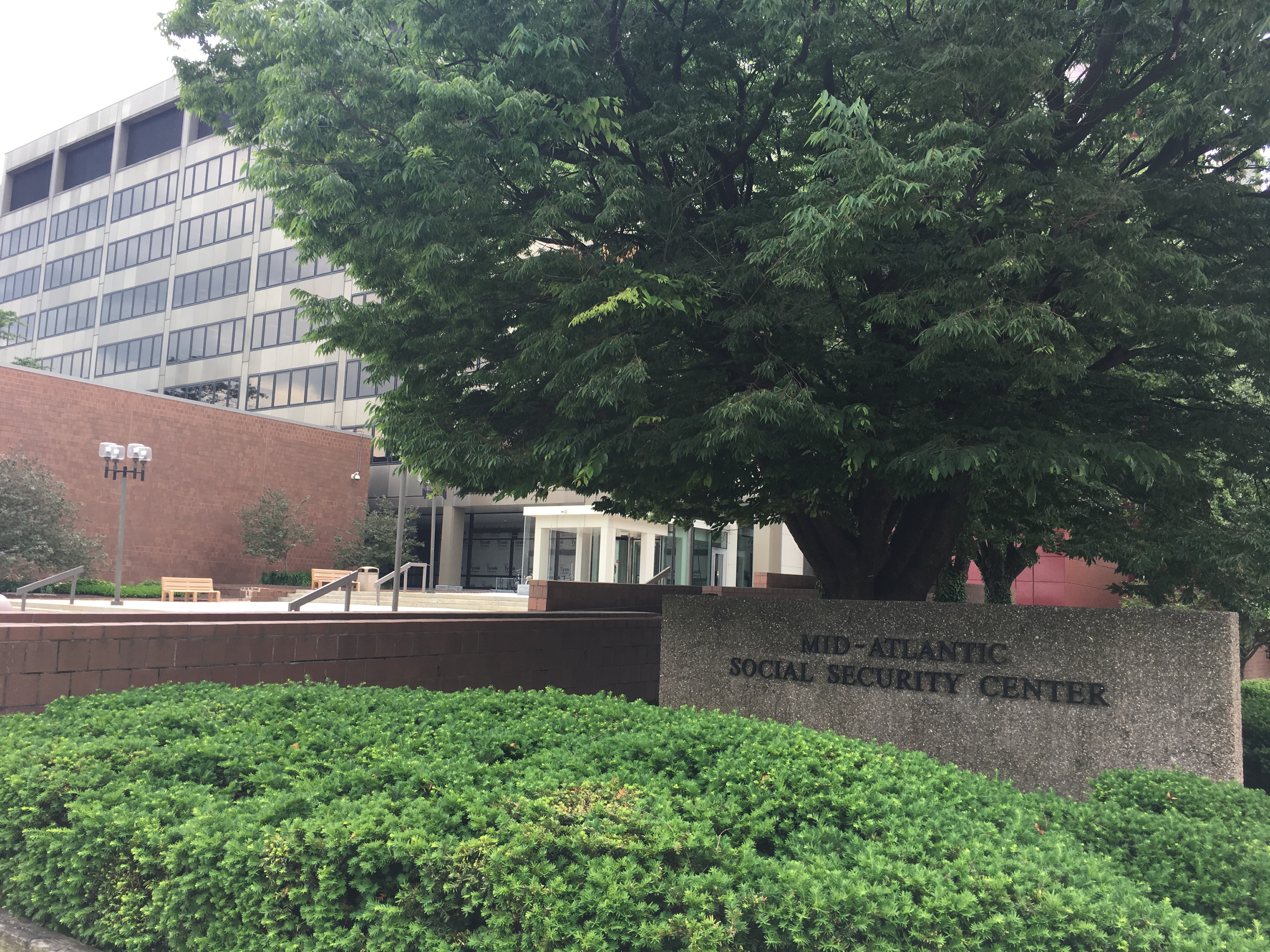
The Mid-Atlantic Program Services Center in Philadelphia

Initially, only 56 percent of the jobs in the United States were covered by Social Security. Today, the system is nearly universal, with 94 percent of individuals in paid employment in the United States working in covered employment.

State and local government workers are not required to participate in the Social Security program if they participate in a public retirement system through their employers. However, state and local governments, through agreements known as Section 218 agreements, may elect to participate in the program. Of the 23.2 million state and local workers in the United States, about 6.6 million are not covered by Social Security. Other workers not covered by Social Security include federal employees hired before 1984, railroad workers, some family employees, some students, and some members of the clergy.

If a job is not covered by Social Security, workers and employers do not pay Social Security payroll taxes. Social Security retirement and disability benefits are not payable unless individuals have sufficient work in Social Security covered employment. Prior to 2025, individuals who worked part of their careers in covered employment and part of their careers in non-covered employment and who received pensions from non-covered employment may have had their Social Security benefits reduced through the Windfall Elimination Provision (WEP) or the Government Pension Offset (GPO). However, this was abolished with the passage of the Social Security Fairness Act.

Railroad workers were covered by the Railroad Retirement Board before Social Security was founded. Today, they still are, though a portion of each railroad pension is designated as "equivalent" to Social Security. Railroad workers also participate in Medicare. All state and local government employees hired since 1986, or who are covered by Section 218 Agreements, participate in Medicare even if not covered for purposes of Social Security benefits.

=== Old age, survivors and disability ===
SSA administers the retirement, survivors, and disabled social insurance programs, which can provide monthly benefits to aged or disabled workers, their spouses and children, and to the survivors of insured workers. In 2010, more than 54 million Americans received approximately $712 billion in Social Security benefits. The programs are primarily financed by taxes which employers, employees, and the self-insured pay annually. These revenues are placed into a special trust fund. These programs are collectively known as Retirement, Survivors, Disability Insurance (RSDI).

SSA administers its disability program partly through its Office of Hearing Operations (OHO), which has regional offices and hearing offices across the United States. OHO processes claims that have been appealed from the first (in prototype states) or second unfavorable determination through the state-based Disability Determination Services (DDS) who develop and process claims at the initial and reconsideration levels of review. OHO runs offices for the approximately 1,200 Administrative Law Judges (ALJs) who develop, evaluate, and adjudicate appellate claims and provide substantive hearings for claimants to obtain testimony and expert evidence prior to issuing a hearing decision with findings of fact and law regarding each claim. OHO publishes a procedural manual called the Hearings, Appeals, and Litigation Law Manual (HALLEX) which "defines procedures for carrying out policy and provides guidance for processing and adjudicating claims" for OHO, the Appeals Council (AC), the Division of Civil Actions (DCA) levels. "It also includes policy statements resulting from Appeals Council en banc meetings under the authority of the Appeals Council Chair."

The RSDI program is the primary benefits program administered by the U.S. federal government, and for some beneficiaries is the vital source of income. Increasing access to this benefit program for low-income or homeless individuals is one of SSA's goals. SSA is a member of the United States Interagency Council on Homelessness and works with other municipal, county, state, local and federal partners to increase access and approval for SSI/SSDI benefits who are eligible.

=== Supplemental Security Income (SSI) ===
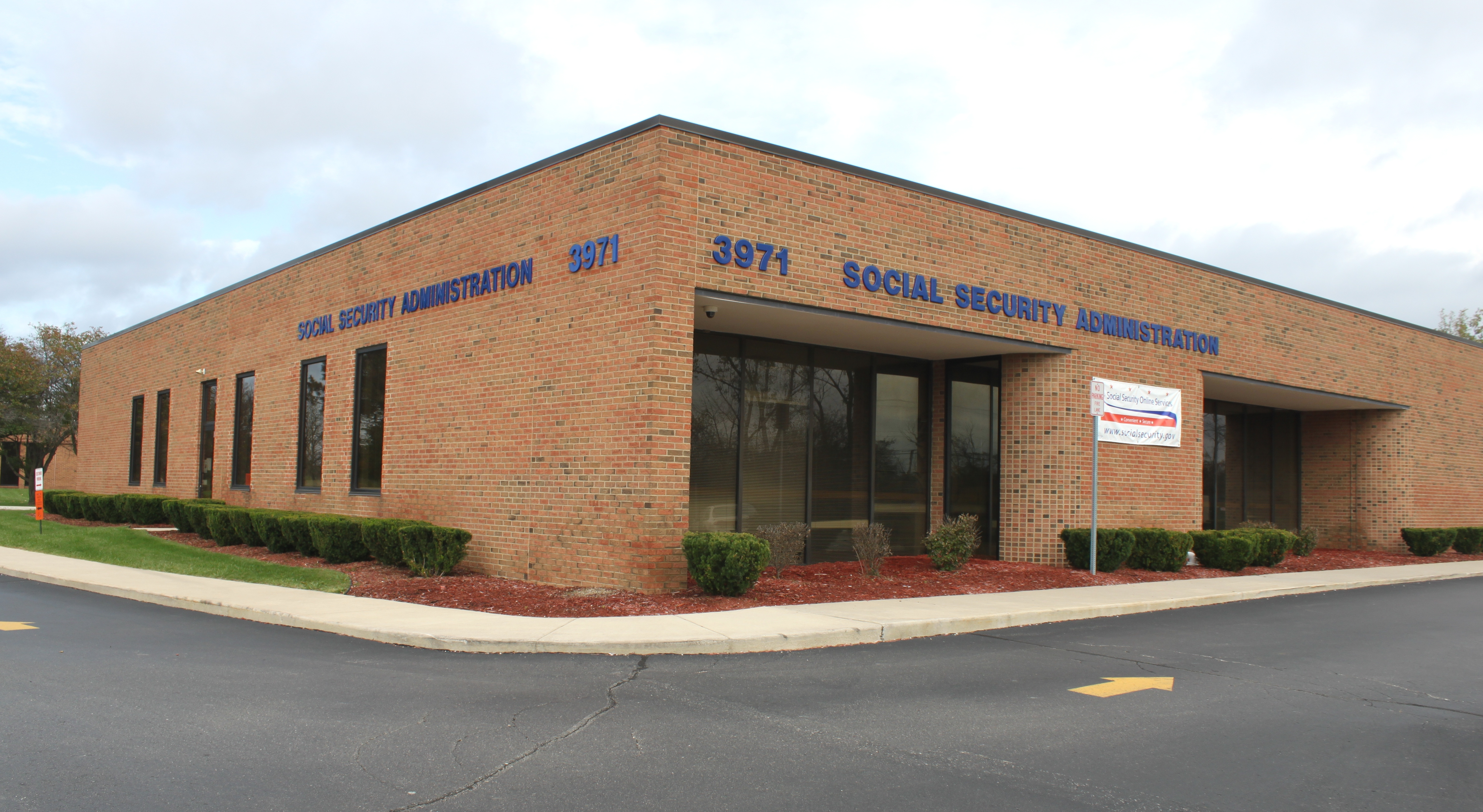
An SSA field office in Ann Arbor, Michigan

SSA also administers the Supplemental Security Income (SSI) program, which is needs-based, for the aged, blind, or disabled. Prior to the 1972 Amendments to the Social Security Act, low-income aged, blind, or disabled persons received benefits from state-run programs called Old-Age Assistance, Aid to the Blind, and Aid to the Permanently and Totally Disabled. These programs received federal funding, but varied in terms of eligibility requirements and benefit payments. The 1972 Amendments replaced these programs with the SSI program. SSA was assigned responsibility for the SSI program and began operations in 1974. Federal benefit payments up to $943 for an SSI individual and $1,371 for an SSI couple are available from the program. SSI benefits are paid out of the general revenue of the United States of America. Some states supplement the federal amount.

Because SSI is needs-based, eligibility is restricted to persons with limited income and resources. In addition, eligibility is generally restricted to U.S. citizens, nationals, and some other groups (such as some refugees) who reside in one of the 50 U.S. states, the District of Columbia, or the Northern Mariana Islands. U.S. citizens and nationals who reside in American Samoa, Guam, Puerto Rico, and the U.S. Virgin Islands are not eligible for SSI. In 2019, 8 million individuals received SSI, including 1.1 million disabled children, 4.6 million disabled adults, and 2.3 million persons 65 or older.

In some cases, individuals may be eligible for Social Security (RSDI) benefits and SSI benefits. For example, a disabled individual who worked in Social Security-covered employment and who has limited income and resources may receive a Social Security disability benefit (due to employment prior to disability) and a partial SSI benefit (due to limited income and resources). SSA refers to these beneficiaries as "concurrent" beneficiaries.

=== Medicare ===
The administration of the Medicare program is a responsibility of the Centers for Medicare and Medicaid Services, but SSA offices are used for determining initial eligibility, some processing of premium payments, and for limited public contact information. They also administer a financial needs-based program called Extra Help, which helps beneficiaries pay the premiums, deductibles, and coinsurance associated with prescription drug coverage under Part D of Medicare. Benefits under this program are estimated to be worth about $5,000 per year. Individuals may apply online for the Extra Help program or by calling SSA.

== Operations ==
To ensure consistent and efficient treatment of Social Security beneficiaries across its organization, SSA has compiled a book known as the Program Operations Manual System (POMS) which governs practically all aspects of SSA's internal operations. POMS describes, in detail, a variety of situations regularly encountered by SSA personnel, and the exact policies and procedures that apply to each situation.

=== Automation ===
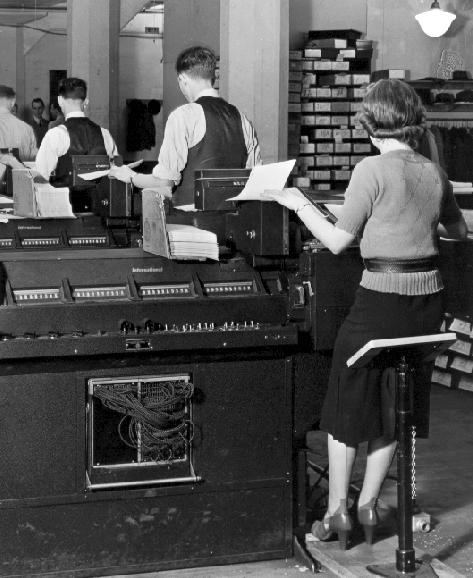
IBM tabulating machines in use at SSA c. 1936

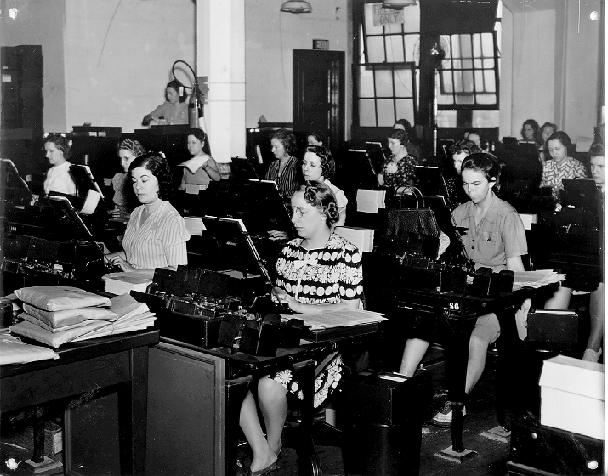
A few of the hundreds of keypunch operators SSA employed throughout the late 1930s and into the 1950s

While the establishment of Social Security predated the invention of the modern digital computer, punched card data processing was a mature technology, and the Social Security system made extensive use of automated unit record equipment from the program's inception. This allowed the Social Security Administration to achieve a high level of efficiency. SSA expenses have always been a small fraction of benefits paid. As a percentage of assets, the administration costs are 0.39%.

=== Adjudication ===
SSA operates its own administrative adjudication system, which has original jurisdiction when claims are denied in part or in full. SSA decisions are issued by Administrative Law Judges and Senior Attorney Adjudicators (supported by about 6,000 staff employees) at locations throughout the United States of the U.S. Office of Hearing Operations, formerly Office of Disability Adjudication and Review (ODAR), who hear and decide challenges to SSA decisions. Dissatisfied claimants can appeal to ODAR's Appeals Council, and if still dissatisfied can appeal to a U.S. District Court.

Over the years, OHO aka ODAR has developed its own procedural system, which is documented in the Hearings and Appeals Litigation Law Manual (HALLEX) (HALLEX). ODAR was formerly known as the Office of Hearings and Appeals (OHA) and, prior to the 1970s, the Bureau of Hearings and Appeals. The name was changed to ODAR in 2007 to reflect the fact that about 75% of the agency's docket consists of disability cases. OHO aka ODAR also adjudicates disputes relating to retirement claims and has jurisdiction when the paternity of a claimant or the validity of a marriage is at issue when a claim is filed for benefits under the earnings record of a spouse or parent. The agency also adjudicates a limited number of Medicare claim issues, which is a residual legacy from when SSA was part of the U.S. Department of Health and Human Services.

=== Statistical publications ===
Each year, just before Mother's Day, SSA releases a list of the names most commonly given to newborn babies in the United States in the previous year, based on applications for Social Security cards. The report includes the 1,000 most common names for both genders. The Popular Baby Names page on the SSA website provides the complete list and allows searches for past years and particular names. For privacy reasons, SSA does not publish data for names with fewer than five occurrences in any given year. The Social Security Administration does not publish data for names with fewer than five occurrences in a single geographic location in any given year. Other baby name tracking sources that do not depend on geographic indicators, such as BabyCenter, can display ranked lists with no name registration minimums. Their name reports also differ by showing naming trends in real time by analyzing information from more than 500,000 parents who actively register births on the BabyCenter site and app (in 2024). These emerging trends and annual rankings have been published for more than 20 years and often publish months ahead of the SSA's official release.

== See also ==
- Social policy
- Social programs in the United States
- Public finance
- Social Security Death Index
- Social Security Disability Insurance
- NOSSCR, National Organization of Social Security Claimants' Representatives
- Richardson v. Perales
- Ticket to Work, SSA's Ticket to Work Program
- Title 20 of the Code of Federal Regulations
- Data.gov
- USAFacts
- SSA impersonation scam
