= Arthur Hess =

Arthur Hess may refer to:

- Arthur E. Hess, acting commissioner of the Social Security Administration
- Arthur Hess (SA general), Nazi Party politician and SA general
