= Kilolo Kijakazi =

American academic and Social Security Administration commissioner

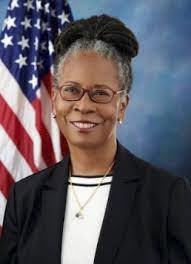

Commissioner of the Social Security Administration
- Acting
- In office July 9, 2021 – December 20, 2023
- President: Joe Biden
- Preceded by: Andrew Saul
- Succeeded by: Martin O'Malley

Personal details
- Education: Binghamton University (BA); Howard University (MSW); George Washington University (PhD)

Kilolo Kijakazi is an American academic who served as acting commissioner of the Social Security Administration from 2021 to 2023. She was previously appointed deputy commissioner for retirement and disability policy in January 2021, before taking on the top position following Andrew Saul's dismissal on July 9, 2021.

== Education ==
Kijakazi earned a Bachelor of Arts degree from Binghamton University, a Master of Social Work from Howard University, and a PhD in public policy from George Washington University.

== Career ==
Kijakazi was an institute fellow at the Urban Institute, where she "worked with staff across the organization to develop collaborative partnerships with those most affected by economic and social issues, to expand and strengthen Urban’s agenda of rigorous research, to effectively communicate findings to diverse audiences, and to recruit and retain a diverse research staff at all levels" while conducting research on economic security, structural racism, and the racial wealth gap.

She was previously a program officer at the Ford Foundation, a senior policy analyst at the Center on Budget and Policy Priorities, a program analyst at the Food and Nutrition Service, and a policy analyst at the National Urban League. Prior to entering the Biden administration, she was also a board member of the Winthrop Rockefeller Foundation, the National Academy of Social Insurance, and Liberation in a Generation. She is co-chair of the National Advisory Council on Eliminating the Black-White Wealth Gap at the Center for American Progress and member of the Commission on Retirement Security and Personal Savings at the Bipartisan Policy Center. Kijakazi is the author of African-American Economic Development and Small Business Ownership.

Political offices
Preceded by Andrew Saul	Commissioner of the Social Security Administration; Acting; 2021–2023	Succeeded by Martin O'Malley
