= Charles I. Schottland =

American administrator

Charles Schottland
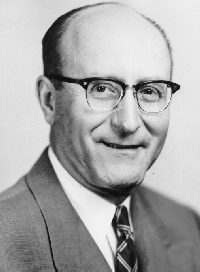

3rd Commissioner of the Social Security Administration
- In office August 23, 1954 – December 31, 1958
- President: Dwight D. Eisenhower
- Preceded by: John W. Tramburg
- Succeeded by: William Mitchell

Personal details
- Born: October 29, 1906; Chicago, Illinois, U.S.
- Died: June 27, 1995 (aged 88); Tucson, Arizona, U.S.
- Political party: Republican
- Education: University of California, Los Angeles (BA); New York University (MSW); University of Southern California (LLB)

Charles I. Schottland (October 29, 1906 – June 27, 1995) was an American administrator who served as the 3rd Commissioner of the Social Security Administration from 1954 to 1958 and as the President of Brandeis University from 1970 to 1972.

He died on June 27, 1995, in Tucson, Arizona at age 88.

Political offices
Preceded by John W. Tramburg	Commissioner of the Social Security Administration; 1954–1958	Succeeded by William Mitchell
