= Don I. Wortman =

U.S. federal government administrator (1927–2020)

Don Wortman
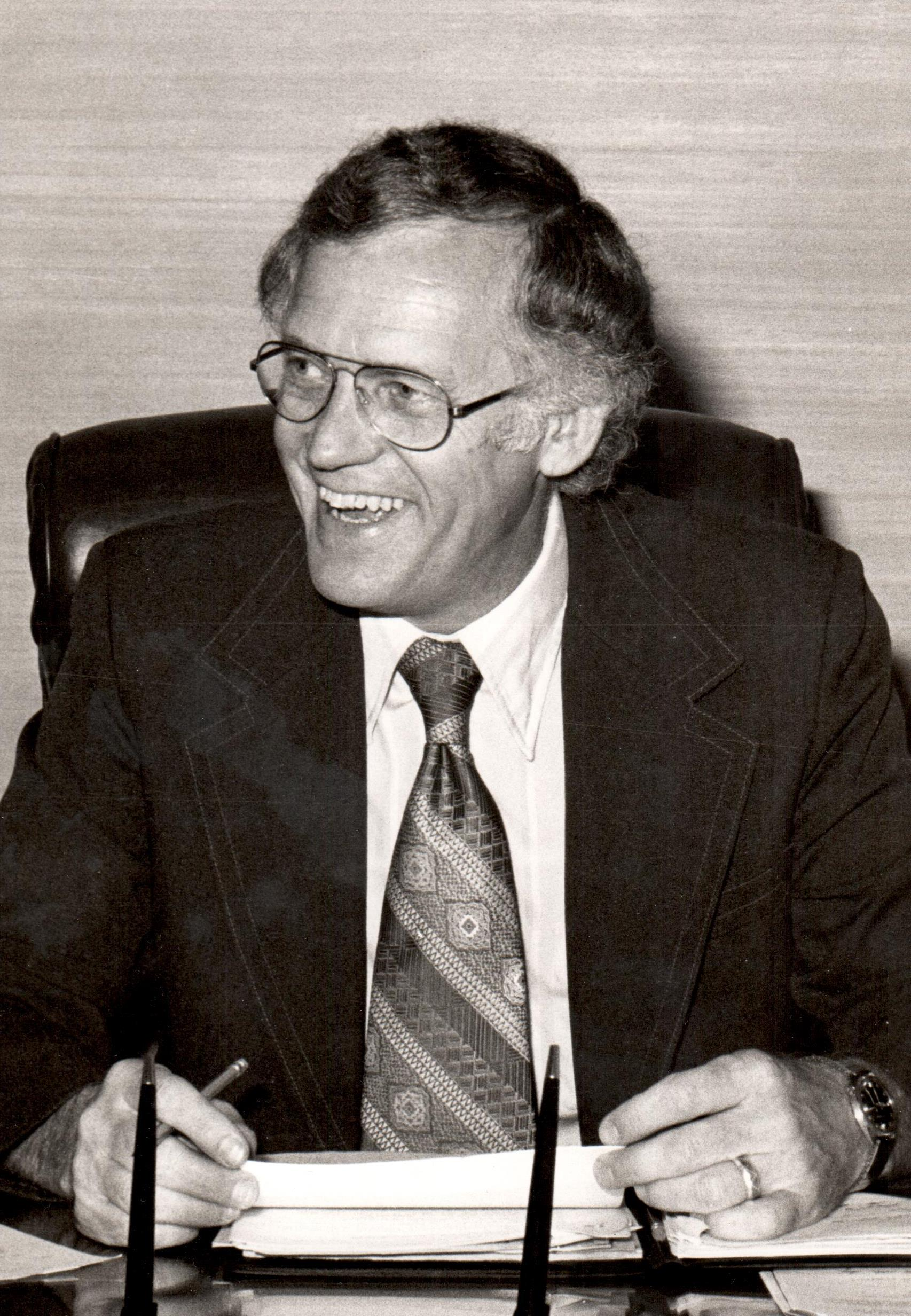
- Wortman in 1978

Commissioner of the Social Security Administration
- Acting
- In office December 13, 1977 – October 4, 1978
- President: Jimmy Carter
- Preceded by: James B. Cardwell
- Succeeded by: Stanford G. Ross

Personal details
- Born: Don Irvin Wortman; November 10, 1927 Lakota, Iowa, U.S.
- Died: March 27, 2020 (aged 92) Albuquerque, New Mexico, U.S.
- Spouse: Dorothy Schroeder (m. 1950)
- Children: 3 sons
- Education: Macalester College (BA); University of Minnesota, Twin Cities (MPA); National Defense University (attended)

Military service
- Allegiance: United States
- Branch/service: United States Army
- Years of service: 1945–1947

Don Irvin Wortman (November 10, 1927 – March 27, 2020) was a U.S. federal government administrator who served 27 years in senior-level executive positions in many federal government agencies. He was Acting Commissioner of the Social Security Administration (SSA) from December 13, 1977, to October 4, 1978. In early 1977, while working at the Department of Health, Education and Welfare (HEW)—precursor to the Department of Health and Human Services—he was Chairman of the task force for implementing the reorganization of HEW. This reorganization included the merging of the Medicare and Medicaid programs into a new agency; this agency was named the Health Care Financing Administration (and renamed the Centers for Medicare and Medicaid Services in June 2001). He became the first Administrator of the Health Care Financing Administration. On two occasions—6 months in 1975 and the first 3 months of 1977—he was Acting Administrator of the Social and Rehabilitation Services, the agency which, at that time, administered the Medicaid program and the Aid to Families with Dependent Children program.

During President Gerald Ford’s administration in 1975-1976, Wortman played a major role in resettling 60,000 Vietnamese refugees in the U.S. (pursuant to the Indochina Migration and Refugee Assistance Act). From 1965 to 1971, he worked at the Office of Economic Opportunity (federal anti-poverty program), where he helped launch Head Start, Upward Bound, and the Community Action Program.

Other federal government agencies in which Wortman served as a senior-level executive include the Atomic Energy Commission, the Price Commission, and the Central Intelligence Agency, where he was the deputy director for administration. In several of these posts, he was directed to take over running them, as political appointees left for other positions. In this regard, he was an exemplar of the federal career Senior Executive Service whose members serve as elite executives and leaders who are expected to move between programs and agencies as issues and challenges arise. He was also unique in that, from 1967 until his retirement in 1981, he served in senior-level political appointee positions under both Republican and Democratic presidents.

Following his retirement from the federal government in 1981, Wortman served as a consultant at the General Accounting Office (now known as the Government Accountability Office).

In 1979, Wortman was elected as a Fellow of the National Academy of Public Administration (NAPA), which is an independent, non-profit, non-partisan organization chartered by Congress to assist government leaders in building more effective, efficient, accountable, and transparent organizations. In the early 1980s, he joined NAPA and became its Vice President and its Director of Federal Programs; he continued working at NAPA until 1995. During his time at NAPA, he led many management studies for a variety of federal agencies, studies which were designed to improve the performance of these agencies. In this capacity, he used his government experience and leadership skills to assist hundreds of federal executives.

In honoring Wortman in November 2014, NAPA CEO and President, Dan G. Blair, stated, “At a time when public servants are often caught up in partisan bickering and cross currents in Washington, it is critically important to remember that these hardworking leaders are the ones who make the government work. It is therefore a great honor to recognize one of these public servants, Don Wortman, who served so many, in so many places over his long career.”

Wortman grew up in Lakota, Iowa (born November 10, 1927). He received his bachelor's degree from Macalester College in St. Paul, Minnesota, his master's degree in public administration from the University of Minnesota, and attended the Industrial College of the Armed Forces of the National Defense University from 1961 to 1962.

== Awards and honors ==
- 1970 Distinguished Citizen Award from Macalester College
- 1972 Distinguished Service Award from the Price Commission
- 1973 Meritorious Service Award, Federal Government Accountants Association
- 1975 Certificate of Appreciation from President Gerald Ford for his work on behalf of the Vietnamese refugees
- 1978 Ewell T. Bartlett Memorial Award for Humanity in Government from the Social Security Administration
- 1981 Intelligence Medal of Merit, for meritorious service, from Stansfield Turner, Director of the Central Intelligence Agency
- 2014 National Academy of Public Administration names its executive board room in honor of Don I. Wortman

Political offices
Preceded by James B. Cardwell	Commissioner of the Social Security Administration; Acting; 1977–1978	Succeeded by Stanford G. Ross
