= Carolyn Colvin =

American civil servant (born 1942)

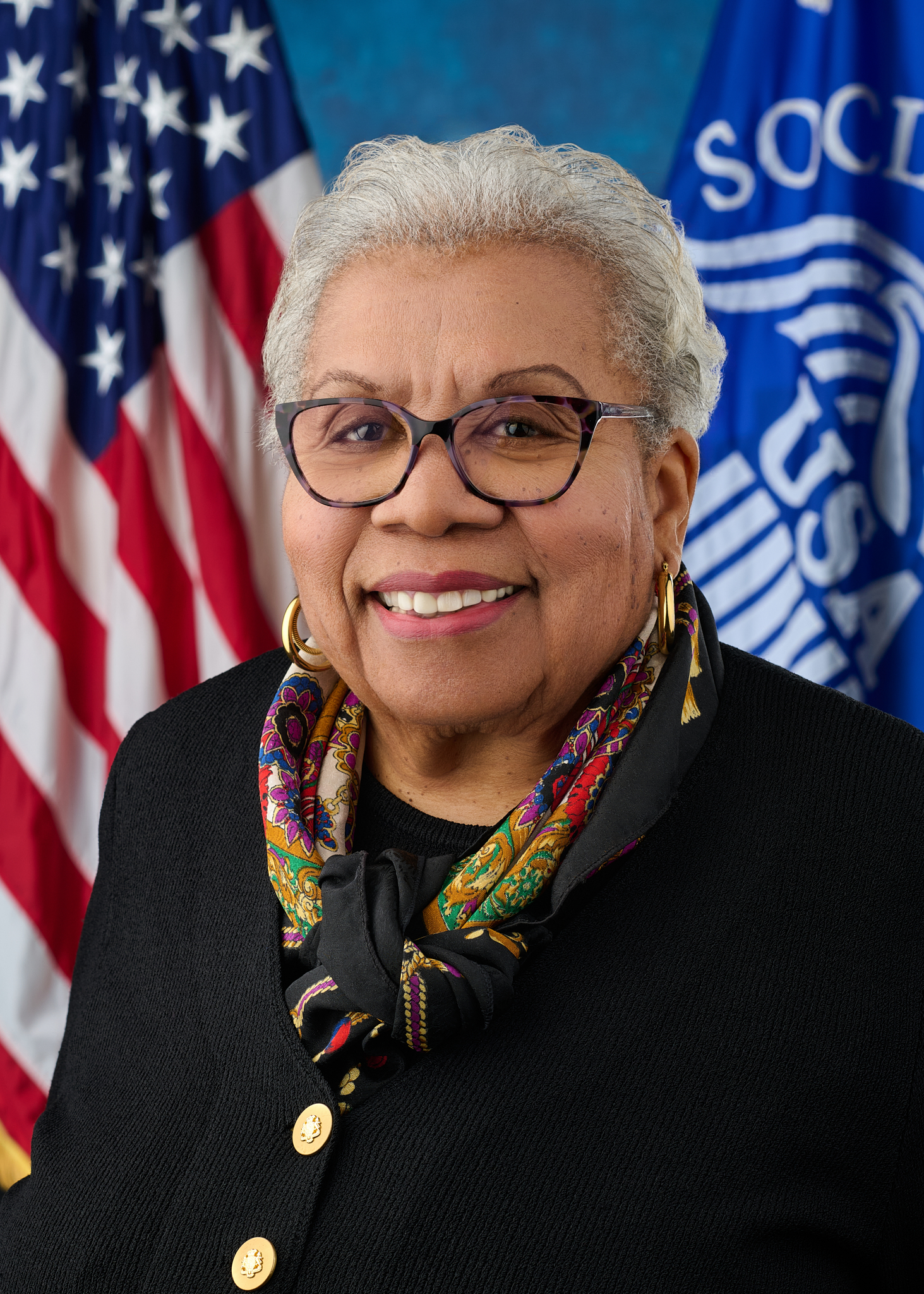
- Official portrait, 2024

Commissioner of the Social Security Administration
- Acting
- In office November 30, 2024 – January 20, 2025
- President: Joe Biden
- Preceded by: Martin O'Malley
- Succeeded by: Michelle King (acting)
- In office January 19, 2013 – January 20, 2017
- President: Barack Obama
- Preceded by: Michael J. Astrue
- Succeeded by: Nancy Berryhill (acting)

Personal details
- Born: May 27, 1942 (age 84) Arnold, Maryland, U.S.
- Party: Democratic
- Education: Morgan State University (BS, MBA)

Carolyn W. Colvin (born May 27, 1942) is an American public administrator who served as Acting Commissioner of the Social Security Administration from 2013 to 2017 and again from 2024 to 2025. On June 20, 2014, President Barack Obama nominated her to serve as the commissioner. On September 18, 2014, the United States Senate Committee on Finance approved her nomination by a 22–2 vote. However, her nomination was never brought up for a vote before the full Senate.

Previously, she was the deputy commissioner, having been nominated by Obama and confirmed by the United States Senate in 2010. She had previously worked at the Social Security Administration during the 1990s.

Colvin is a graduate of Morgan State University with a BS in Business Administration and an MBA. She has one son and six grandchildren.

== Career ==
Colvin served as Secretary of the Maryland Department of Human Resources from 1989 to 1994. She went on to perform a number of roles for the Social Security Administration, the Deputy Commissioner for Policy and External Affairs, from 1994 to 1996, the Deputy Commissioner for Programs and Policy, from 1996 to 1998, and the Deputy Commissioner for Operations, from 1998 to 2001.

She served as Director of the District of Columbia Department of Human Services, from 2001 to 2003, before going on to be the Director of the Montgomery County Department of Health and Human Services, from 2003 to 2007, and the Chief Executive Officer of AMERIGROUP Community Care of the District of Columbia, from 2007 to 2008.

She was appointed Special Assistant to the Secretary of Maryland Department of Transportation, serving from 2009 to 2011.

In November 2020, Colvin was named a member of the Joe Biden presidential transition Agency Review Team to support transition efforts related to the Social Security Administration.

Colvin is a Fellow of the National Academy of Public Administration.

Political offices
Preceded by Michael J. Astrue	Commissioner of the Social Security Administration; Acting; 2013–2017	Succeeded by Nancy Berryhill; Acting
Preceded by Martin O'Malley	Commissioner of the Social Security Administration; Acting; 2024–2025	Succeeded by Michelle King; Acting
