= John W. Tramburg =

John Tramburg
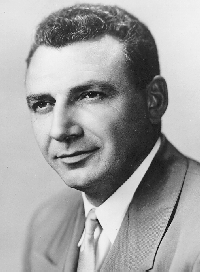
- Official portrait, 1953

2nd Commissioner of the Social Security Administration
- In office November 24, 1953 – July 31, 1954
- President: Dwight D. Eisenhower
- Preceded by: William Mitchell (acting)
- Succeeded by: Charles I. Schottland

Personal details
- Born: February 28, 1913 Fall River, Wisconsin, U.S.
- Died: January 14, 1963 (aged 49) Trenton, New Jersey, U.S.
- Party: Republican
- Education: Carroll College (attended); University of Wisconsin, Whitewater (BA); University of Chicago (MA)

John W. Tramburg (February 28, 1913 – January 14, 1963) was an American administrator who served as the 2nd Commissioner of the Social Security Administration from 1953 to 1954.

Tramburg was born in Fall River, Wisconsin. He died of a heart attack on January 14, 1963, in Trenton, New Jersey at age 49.

Political offices
Preceded by William Mitchell; Acting	Commissioner of the Social Security Administration; 1953–1954	Succeeded by Charles I. Schottland
