= Robert M. Ball =

American government official (1914–2008)

Bob Ball
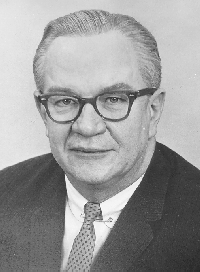
- Official portrait

5th Commissioner of the Social Security Administration
- In office April 17, 1962 – March 17, 1973
- President: John F. Kennedy; Lyndon B. Johnson; Richard Nixon
- Preceded by: William Mitchell
- Succeeded by: Arthur E. Hess (acting)

Personal details
- Born: March 28, 1914 New York City, New York, U.S.
- Died: January 29, 2008 (aged 93) Mitchellville, Maryland, U.S.
- Party: Democratic
- Education: Wesleyan University (BA, MA)
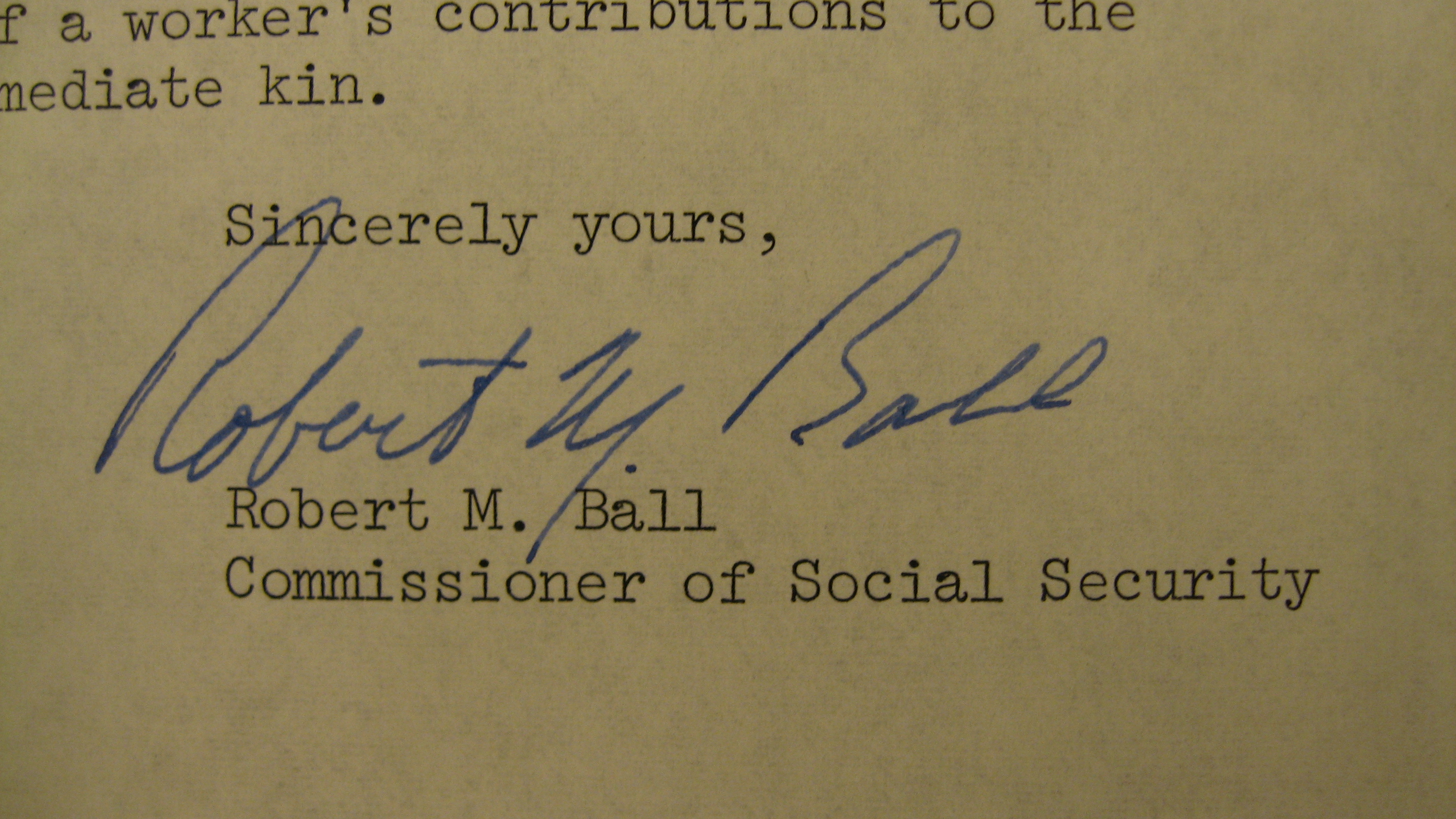
- Signature

Robert Myers Ball (March 28, 1914 – January 29, 2008) was an American Social Security official, who served under three presidents (Kennedy, Johnson, and Nixon), from 1962 to 1973, as the 5th Commissioner of Social Security. He is the longest-serving head of the Social Security Administration to date. He also founded the National Academy for Social Insurance. He graduated from Wesleyan University in 1935, and in 1936 received a master's degree in economics from the same institution.

After working three years in private industry, Ball joined the field organization of the Bureau of Old-Age and Survivors Insurance (BOASI), predecessor to the present Social Security Administration, in 1939. He held various field jobs, including manager of a New Jersey district office, before transferring to central office. In early 1946, Mr. Ball temporarily left the Bureau to work for the American Council on Education, and then, during part of 1947 and 1948 he served as staff director of the Advisory Council on Social Security to the U.S. Senate Committee on Finance. Mr. Ball returned to BOASI in 1949 as assistant director in charge of the Division of Program Analysis. Three years later he was appointed Deputy Director of BOASI, and between 1953 and 1954 he served as BOASI's Acting Director. In 1962 he was appointed Commissioner of Social Security, a position he held until his retirement in 1973.

In 1947, Ball wrote the key statement defining why social insurance, not welfare, should be America's primary income maintenance program.

The Los Angeles Times quoted Lawrence Thompson, chairman of the National Academy of Social Insurance, as saying, "No individual has done more to advance American social insurance programs than Robert M. Ball."

== See also ==
- Rashi Fein

Political offices
Preceded by William Mitchell	Commissioner of the Social Security Administration; 1962–1973	Succeeded by Arthur Hess; Acting
