= Michael J. Astrue =

American lawyer and poet (born 1956)

Michael Astrue
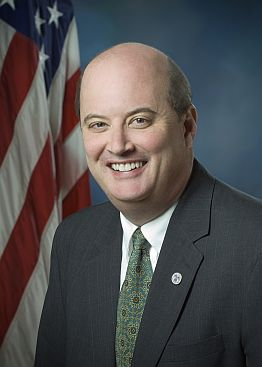

15th Commissioner of the Social Security Administration
- In office February 12, 2007 – January 19, 2013
- President: George W. Bush; Barack Obama
- Preceded by: Linda S. McMahon (acting)
- Succeeded by: Carolyn Colvin (acting)

Personal details
- Born: October 1, 1956 (age 69)
- Party: Republican
- Education: Yale University (BA); Harvard University (JD)

Michael James Astrue (born October 1, 1956) is an American lawyer and, under the pen name A. M. Juster, a poet and critic. He served as the 15th Commissioner of the Social Security Administration from 2007 to 2013. Astrue was Poetry Editor of First Things from 2018 to 2020, and was Poetry Editor of Plough Quarterly from 2020 to 2024.

== Education ==
He graduated magna cum laude from Roxbury Latin School in 1974. He received his B.A. magna cum laude from Yale University in 1978 with honors in Philosophy and English, where he was also President of the Yale Political Union and won the Pierson Scholarship Award. He was told by an administrator that the politics of a "Gerald Ford Republican" were an obstacle to receiving academic fellowships. He received his Juris Doctor cum laude from Harvard Law School in 1983. In 2013 he received an honorary doctor of laws from the New England School of Law and an honorary doctor of humane letters from Southern Vermont College.

== Career ==
After graduating from Yale, he worked briefly as a staff assistant for Senator Richard Schweiker (R-PA) and as a demonstration program evaluator for two non-profit organizations. He also took a two-month leave of absence to be co-coordinator of the 1980 John B. Anderson primary campaign in Connecticut, but did not support Anderson's run as an independent.

After graduating from law school, he clerked from 1983 to 1984 for U.S. District Court Judge Walter Jay Skinner. He worked as a litigation associate at the Boston law firm of Ropes & Gray from 1984 to 1985 and then worked in the United States Department of Health and Human Services as an Acting Deputy Assistant Secretary for Legislation (Human Services) from 1985 to 1986. He then served as Counselor to the Commissioner of the Social Security Administration from 1986 to 1988 where he led the agency's efforts to end its controversial policy of “nonacquiescence” to certain federal court decisions.

In April 1988, President Reagan named him Associate Counsel to the President where he served until June 1989. In that capacity he served briefly as White House Ethics Officer, oversaw litigation responses related to the Iran-Contra affair, and drafted the first operations plan for the 25th Amendment. President Bush nominated him for General Counsel of the U.S. Department of Health and Human Services in June 1989 and the Senate unanimously confirmed him later that month. He served until November 1992 and, by virtue of his position, he also had concurrent appointments to the United States Access Board, which received broad regulatory authority after enactment of the Americans with Disabilities Act of 1990, and to the Administrative Conference of the United States.

As General Counsel, Astrue personally tried and won the first federal HIV discrimination enforcement suit, he personally argued and won the first patient dumping enforcement suit, and co-authored with David M. McIntosh the first accelerated drug approval regulation targeted for treatments for fatal diseases for which there was no significant treatment. He also was involved in high-profile disputes with National Institutes of Health Director Bernadine Healy over the patenting of human DNA sequences of unidentified function and with the state of Oregon's use of polling data about quality of life to deny medications to people with HIV; his positions ultimately prevailed in both disputes.

Astrue worked as a partner in the health law department of the Boston law firm of Mintz, Levin, Cohn, Ferris, Glovsky and Popeo from November 1992 until June 1993 until he joined Biogen as General Counsel in June 1993. At Biogen he was known for prevailing in multiple lawsuits attempting to block the sale of Avonex, which became a breakthrough drug for multiple sclerosis, and for obtaining important patent extensions.

In 2000 Astrue joined Transkaryotic Therapies as Senior Vice President-Administration and General Counsel. In that year he was also elected to a two-year term as Chair of the Massachusetts Biotechnology Council where he led the creation of the council's charitable arm, now known as MassBioEd. In 2001-2002 he was considered President Bush's top choice for Food and Drug Administration Commissioner but faced opposition from Senate Democrats because of his industry experience. In 2003 he briefly left Transkaryotic Therapies and then returned as chief executive officer. In twenty-six months as chief executive officer he engineered one of the most successful turnarounds in biotechnology history and then lost control of the company to Shire Pharmaceuticals in a controversial hostile takeover. In August 2005, Astrue was named Interim Chief Executive Officer of the failing Epix Pharmaceuticals and orchestrated a merger of the company with Predix Pharmaceuticals in May, 2006.

President Bush nominated Astrue to be Commissioner of Social Security on September 14, 2006. The Senate unanimously confirmed him on February 1, 2007, and he was sworn in on February 12, 2007. He inherited a rapidly growing backlog of disability cases, which he reduced significantly over his six years in office. One of his initiatives in this area was a system called “Compassionate Allowances” which expedites review of claims certain or almost certain to be allowed, often within a matter of days. A list of these qualifying conditions was created too which are all very serious, difficult to live with, and many are considered terminal illnesses. He moved the agency from its longstanding reliance on COBOL toward web-based systems and improved the quantity and quality of the agency's electronic services, which ranked at the top of the public satisfaction surveys of the American Customer Satisfaction Index. He saw that the agency's fraying computer center would be out of capacity by late 2012 and had no significant backup capacity; he built two new co-equal data centers, one of which became operational during his term and one of which became operational shortly after he left office. During his tenure the time to a hearing dropped to under a year, but then rose quickly after his tenure.

In August 2013, Astrue stepped into the interim CEO position at InVivo Therapeutics, a failing biotech company whose founder/CEO, Frank Reynolds, would later face criminal charges. Astrue refocused the company, put the long-delayed clinical program back on track, and identified his successor for the board. He stepped down in January 2014; the company was then able to raise money and continue work on its product for spinal cord injury.

Since leaving InVivo, Astrue has focused on his writing (see below) and nonprofit boards. He is currently a board member for the National Alliance for Hispanic Health and the Association of Writers and Writing Programs. In 2025, Astrue was the recipient of the Robert M. Ball Award from the National Academy of Social Insurance along with Martin O'Malley for his "leadership, innovation, and dedication to strengthening the Social Security Administration."

== Literary work as A. M. Juster (pseudonym) ==
In the June 2010 issue of First Things, Paul Mariani disclosed that Astrue had been publishing original and translated poetry for many years under the pseudonym of A. M. Juster, an anagram of M. J. Astrue. His work has appeared in top literary journals, including Poetry, Hudson Review, Paris Review, and Rattle.

In 1995, Mona Van Duyn selected his sonnet “Moscow Zoo” as the winner of the 1995 Howard Nemerov Sonnet Award sponsored by The Formalist. He went on to win again in 2000 and 2008, thus becoming the only three-time winner of the award. In 2002 Rachel Hadas selected his book of original poetry and translations, The Secret Language of Women, as the winner of the 2002 Richard Wilbur Award. In 2014 he was a co-winner of the Willis Barnstone Translation Prize for his translation of a Middle Welsh poem by proto-feminist Gwerful Mechain.

He has published twelve books:

- Longing for Laura (Petrarch translations) (Birch Brook Press 2001)
- The Secret Language of Women (University of Evansville Press 2003)
- The Satires of Horace (University of Pennsylvania Press 2008)
- Tibullus' Elegies (Oxford University Press 2012)
- Saint Aldhelm’s Riddles (University of Toronto Press 2015)
- Sleaze & Slander (Measure Press 2016)
- The Billy Collins Experience (Kelsay Books 2016)
- The Elegies of Maximianus (University of Pennsylvania Press 2018)
- John Milton's The Book of Elegies (Paideia Institute Press 2019)
- Wonder & Wrath (Paul Dry Books 2020)
- Girlatee (Paul Dry Books 2025)
- Canzoniere (Petrarch translation) (Liveright / W.W.Norton 2026).

Political offices
| Preceded by Linda S. McMahon; Acting | Commissioner of the Social Security Administration; 2007–2013 | Succeeded by Carolyn Colvin; Acting |
