= Nancy Berryhill =

American politician

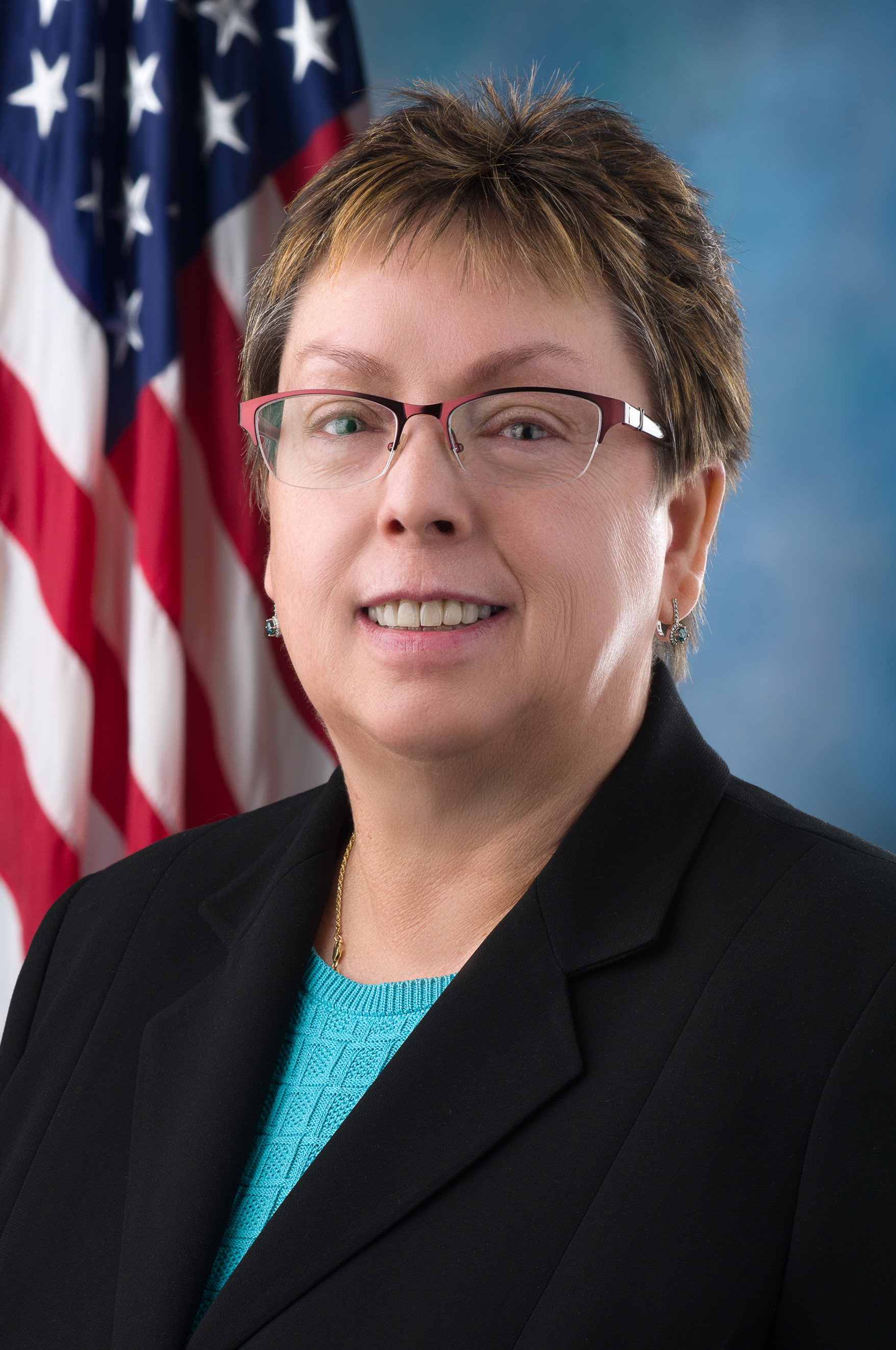
- Official portrait, 2017

Commissioner of the Social Security Administration
- Acting
- In office January 23, 2017 – June 4, 2019*
- President: Donald Trump
- Preceded by: Carolyn Colvin (acting)
- Succeeded by: Andrew Saul

Personal details
- Born: Chicago, Illinois, U.S.
- Education: Control Data Institute (BS)
- *The GAO ruled on March 6, 2018 that Berryhill was unauthorized to serve as acting commissioner from November 17, 2017; however, she functionally continued to lead the agency.

Nancy Ann Berryhill is the former acting Commissioner of the Social Security Administration. On March 6, 2018, the Government Accountability Office stated that as of November 17, 2017, Berryhill's status violated the Federal Vacancies Reform Act, which limits the time a position can be filled by an acting official; "[t]herefore Ms. Berryhill was not authorized to continue serving using the title of Acting Commissioner after November 16." Berryhill responded that "Moving forward, I will continue to lead the agency from my position of record, Deputy Commissioner of Operations."

On April 17, 2018, President Trump nominated Andrew Saul to the position of Commissioner of Social Security. This action allowed Berryhill to regain the title of “Acting Commissioner;" she held that position until Saul was confirmed by the United States Senate on June 4, 2019.

Political offices
Preceded by Carolyn Colvin; Acting	Commissioner of the Social Security Administration; Acting; 2017–2019	Succeeded by Andrew Saul
