= James B. Cardwell =

American politician (1922–2012)

James Cardwell
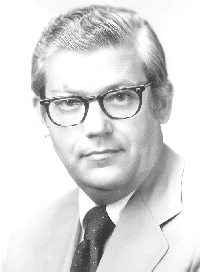
- Official portrait

6th Commissioner of the Social Security Administration
- In office October 24, 1973 – December 12, 1977
- President: Richard Nixon; Gerald Ford; Jimmy Carter
- Preceded by: Arthur E. Hess (acting)
- Succeeded by: Don I. Wortman (acting)

Personal details
- Born: 1922 Washington, D.C., U.S.
- Died: December 4, 2012 (aged 89–90) Roswell, Georgia, U.S.
- Education: Catholic University (BA)
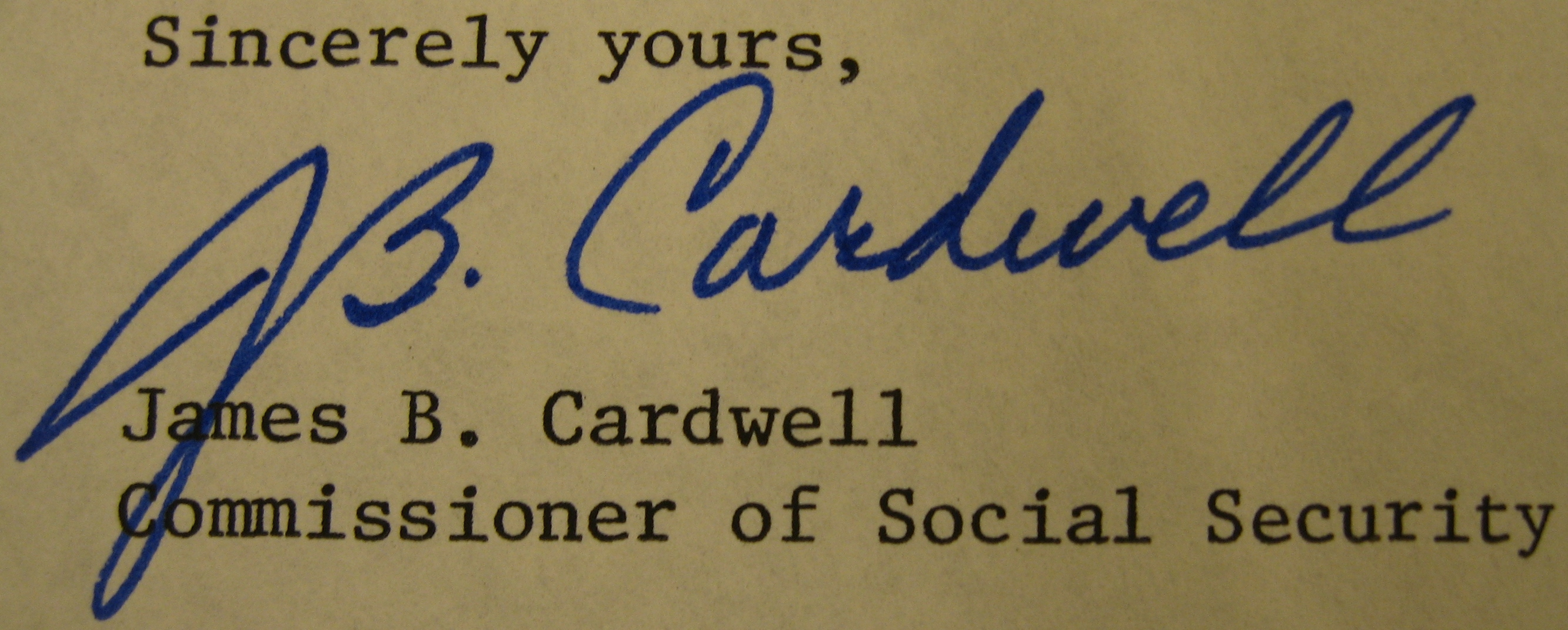
- Signature

James Bruce Cardwell (1922 – December 4, 2012) was a bureaucrat in the federal government of the United States. Born in Washington, D.C. in 1922 and a graduate of the city's Western High School, Cardwell began his federal service in 1942 as a clerk in the Public Housing Administration. After serving with the U.S. Army in Europe during World War II, he returned to the Public Housing Administration in 1945, where he worked on administrative and budget assignments until 1954. In 1955, Cardwell received a bachelor's degree from Columbus University. In the same year, he joined the Department of Health, Education, and Welfare, serving in various budget positions through 1973 when he resigned as DHEW's Assistant Secretary and Comptroller to become the 6th Commissioner of the Social Security Administration, a post he held until the end of 1977. He then spent a short time as an executive for the Corporation for Public Broadcasting before taking a position with the Blue Cross Blue Shield Association, and he concluded his career with five years' service at the Nasco health insurance firm.

Cardwell married the former Mary Louise Sheppard in 1942; the parents of four sons, they were married until her 1994 death. He died in Roswell, Georgia on 4 December 2012 after suffering a broken hip; he had been living in Alpharetta, Georgia.

Political offices
Preceded by Arthur Hess; Acting	Commissioner of the Social Security Administration; 1973–1977	Succeeded by Don I. Wortman; Acting
