= Stanford G. Ross =

American attorney (1931–2020)

Stanford Ross
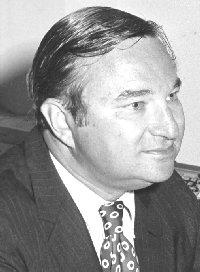
- Ross in 1978

7th Commissioner of the Social Security Administration
- In office October 5, 1978 – December 31, 1979
- President: Jimmy Carter
- Preceded by: Don I. Wortman (acting)
- Succeeded by: Herbert Doggette (acting)

Personal details
- Born: October 9, 1931 St. Louis, Missouri, U.S.
- Died: August 26, 2020 (aged 88) Washington, D.C., U.S.
- Party: Democratic
- Spouse: Dorothy Ross
- Education: Washington University (BA); Harvard University (LLB)

Stanford G. Ross (October 9, 1931 – August 26, 2020) was an American attorney who served as the 7th Commissioner of the Social Security Administration from 1978 to 1979.

Ross was born in St. Louis, Missouri. He went to Washington University as an undergraduate and went to Harvard Law School for his law degree. For four years he was a professor at the New York University School of Law, before becoming a White House staff assistant in 1967. From August 1967 to early 1968, he served as the Executive Director of the President's National Advisory Panel on Insurance in Riot-Affected Areas. Thereafter and until 1969, he was the General Counsel for the Department of the Treasury. After resigning from the Commissioner of the Social Security Administration, he began a law firm with Joseph A. Califano.

Ross was married to his wife, Dorothy, for sixty-two years. He had two children and two grandchildren. Ross died of heart failure on August 26, 2020, in Washington, D.C., at age 88.

Political offices
Preceded by Don I. Wortman; Acting	Commissioner of the Social Security Administration; 1978–1979	Succeeded by Herbert Doggette; Acting
