= Andrew Saul =

American businessman (born 1946)

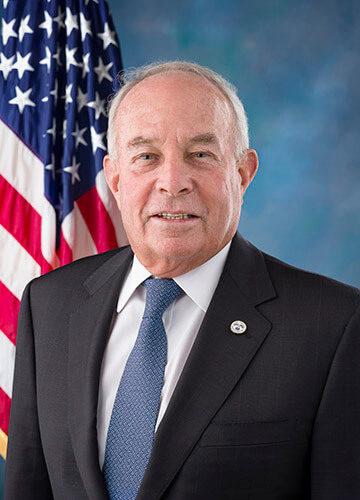
- Official portrait, 2019

16th Commissioner of the Social Security Administration
- In office June 17, 2019 – July 9, 2021
- President: Donald Trump; Joe Biden
- Preceded by: Nancy Berryhill (acting)
- Succeeded by: Martin O'Malley

Chair of the Federal Retirement Thrift Investment Board
- In office November 15, 2002 – August 22, 2011
- President: George W. Bush; Barack Obama
- Preceded by: James Atkins
- Succeeded by: Michael Kennedy

Personal details
- Born: Andrew Marshall Saul; November 6, 1946 (age 80) New York City, U.S.
- Party: Republican
- Education: University of Pennsylvania (BS)

Andrew Marshall Saul (born November 6, 1946) is an American businessman and political candidate who served as the 16th commissioner of the United States Social Security Administration from 2019 to 2021. Saul was fired from the position by President Joe Biden on July 9, 2021, after refusing to offer his requested resignation. Saul stated that his discharge was illegal.

Saul previously served as the chair of the Federal Retirement Thrift Investment Board (FRTIB) and vice chairman of the New York Metropolitan Transportation Authority. Saul has been a general partner in the investment firm Saul Partners, L.P., since 1986. As chair of the Thrift Investment Board, he oversaw the Thrift Savings Plan (TSP), a retirement savings account for employees of the Federal Government and soldiers of the armed services.

== Early life and education ==
Saul was born to a Jewish family in New York City. He graduated from the Wharton School of the University of Pennsylvania in 1968.

== Career ==
=== Business ===
Saul began his career with Brooks Fashion Stores, rising to become its president, and growing the company into a large corporation listed on the New York Stock Exchange. Along with his father, he then purchased the bankrupt South Florida women's apparel company Caché Inc. and restored it to solvency. The company was an upscale fashion store with 300 outlets around the world, and was publicly traded on the NASDAQ. He has served on the board of directors since 1986, and as chair from February 1993 to October 2000. Cache again filed for bankruptcy protection in 2015 when it ceased all operations.

In 1986, he founded an investment firm with his father, Saul Partners, L.P., as a partner. He is a member of the board of trustees of the Federation of Jewish Philanthropies, the United Jewish Appeal Federation, the Sarah Neuman Nursing Home, the Wharton School of Business, the Manhattan Institute, and Mount Sinai Hospital, New York City. He is also a member of the Chairman's Council of the Metropolitan Museum of Art and a patron of the Museum of Modern Art, and is one of the top art collectors in New York, with extensive holdings of modern art and contemporary art, especially post war American and Chinese bronzes. In May 2013, he was made a member of the board of trustees for the National Gallery of Art.

=== Metropolitan Transportation Authority ===
In 2006, Saul was appointed by Governor George Pataki to a six-year term as a vice-chairman of the Metropolitan Transportation Authority after nine years as a board member. He was recommended by Westchester County Executive Andy Spano. He also served as Chair of the Finance Committee, and was a member of each of the other eleven board committees of the MTA. Saul was originally appointed to the board to represent Westchester County in 1996 by County Executive Andrew O'Rourke.

In 2005, Saul was one of only two members to vote against a one-time $50 million holiday fare discount from the MTA's budget surplus.

=== Federal Thrift Retirement Investment Board ===
Saul was nominated by President George W. Bush and confirmed by the United States Senate in 2002 as chairman of the Federal Retirement Thrift Investment Board, the agency which manages the Thrift Savings Plan for employees of Federal Government agencies, and soldiers in the Armed Services, providing retirement security for more than 3.7 million participants. He was confirmed unanimously by the Senate, which was controlled by the Democrats. Saul replaced James H. Atkins of Arkansas, who had been nominated to a third term by President Bill Clinton in a recess appointment. Since being appointed by President Bush, Saul pushed for more rigorous audits of TSP operations. The General Accounting Office concurred with Saul's efforts in a 2003 report, urging Congress to set up procedures that would keep it better informed about the operations and policy decisions at the federal employee retirement program, suggesting that Congress could "establish a formal process by which the Secretary of Labor can report to the Congress issues of critical concern associated with the actions of the TSP board and executive director."

During his confirmation hearing, Senator Daniel Akaka told Saul he would be facing a difficult situation, as the outgoing executive director had taken a number of actions before his sudden departure which led to "demoralization of the TSP staff, expensive lawsuits, investigations, rancorous battles with other agencies, along with the costs of a failed record keeping system project" that were all eventually dealt with by the FRTIB. Shortly after Saul assumed office, TSP Executive Director James Petrick resigned. It has been alleged by former FRTIB Chairman and Executive Director Roger Mehle that this occurred when Petrick wished to pursue a lawsuit against the contractor for the record keeping system which led to a conflict with the Justice Department over whether the board had standing to sue. Saul pursued a settlement and dropped the lawsuit. In 2007, Mehle launched his own lawsuit against Saul and the board which alleges that the board violated its fiduciary duty to TSP participants by forcing out Petrick in order to settle the lawsuit against the contractor.

With the Thrift Savings Board, he eliminated open enrollment periods, which had allowed eligible participants to enroll year-round.

Saul, and his executive director Gary Amelio, inherited a mishandled computer project for a new record-keeping system, which had been started in 1997 and wasted $36 million. The system was eventually brought online in 2003. Under the direction of Saul and Amelio, a new mainframe computer was installed that ran ten times faster than the old system, with an emergency backup computer that can be used in the event of a disaster. The agency also acquired its first toll-free line, opened two new call centers, and extended hours for customer service. On May 3, 2007, President George W. Bush renominated Saul to two more consecutive terms on the board expiring September 25, 2012. Following the resignation of Gary Amelio in 2007, Saul appointed Gregory T. Long as executive director for the Thrift Savings Plan. Long was previously the director of product development for the TSP.

In June 2007, the Federal Thrift Retirement Investment Board approved a resolution to prohibit Congress from proposing that companies that do business in Iran or Sudan be removed from the Thrift Savings Plan, in order to reduce support for Iran's oil and gas industry or to reprimand the Sudanese government for its role in the Darfur conflict. Saul said such changes would not be in the TSP participants' best interest since the changes would go against past precedent that the TSP not interfere in social or political matters. Members of Congress including Reps. Tom Davis, Jon Porter, Henry Waxman, and Danny Davis, wrote Saul in July 2005 saying that they wanted to have an independent professional investment consultant examine whether new investment choices would benefit TSP participants, which led to a conflict between Congress and the board regarding real estate investment trust funds.

Saul and other board members discussed several future options for the TSP, including asking Congress to require automatic enrollment in the TSP for new hires, as Government employees now must sign up for a payroll deduction. Other proposals included asking Congress whether to designate a new default fund for FERS employees who do not enroll but receive a mandatory agency contribution of 1 percent of salary, since that money now goes into the government securities fund, but TSP officials think the L Funds would be a more appropriate, long-term investment. Saul also suggested adding a Roth 401(k)-style feature to the TSP that is similar to Roth individual savings accounts, by allowing participants to make contributions with money that has been taxed, with the contributions growing tax-free and account balances being withdrawn tax-free. Employees now contribute pre-tax dollars to the TSP and pay taxes when they withdraw their savings. President Bush likened his social security privatization plan to the TSP, although it was never adopted. Bush believed that the TSP could serve as a model for his proposed personal accounts.

Under Saul's stewardship, the board tightened the rules for the TSP loan program in 2004, imposing a waiting period for new loans and charging a loan-processing fee, which dropped the number of loans issued from about 1,800 loans per day to an average of 534 per day. TSP participants may hold two loans at the same time and pay them back through payroll deductions, and may pay off a loan early and immediately request a new loan. The Board felt the loan program was partially responsible for the slowdown during the launch of the new-record keeping system. The Board also felt that participants are asked to absorb the cost of a loan program that they rarely use, and that the borrowers were also tying up the TSP's limited staff resources, leading to the changes. During a 2005 audit called for by Saul, representatives of Deloitte & Touche gave the TSP a clean audit and said they found no major problems with TSP's internal financial controls.

=== Political involvement ===
Saul was a Bush Pioneer in 2000 and 2004, raising over $100,000 for the Bush-Cheney campaign, and has contributed to numerous Republican candidates and served on the National Republican Senatorial Committee. Along with Bill Kristol and Peggy Noonan, Saul is a trustee of the Manhattan Institute for Policy Research, a prominent conservative think-tank which promotes limited government and free-market principles whose mission is to "develop and disseminate new ideas that foster greater economic choice and individual responsibility" and has hosted policy speeches by then-National Security Advisor Condoleezza Rice in 2002 and both President Bush and Vice President Dick Cheney in 2006. His daughter, Jennifer Saul Yaffa, is the National Committeewoman of the Republican National Committee from the New York Republican State Committee. She is also head of the Manhattan GOP.

For several months in 2007, Saul was a candidate for the Republican nomination to run against U.S. Representative John Hall in the 2008 election. Saul had been eyeing the seat for New York's 19th congressional district since 1993, when Sue Kelly won a crowded primary. She won the seat and held it until being defeated by Hall in 2006.

Saul's 2007 campaign raised more money than Hall in the second quarter of 2007, although Hall had more total money on hand. A spokesman for the National Republican Congressional Committee described Saul as a "top recruit". Another Republican candidate, Iraq War veteran Kieran Lalor, criticized Saul as being too liberal, saying he was "Sue Kelly all over again".

On November 20, 2007, Saul announced that he was dropping out of the race because of unspecified "personal reasons".

=== Social Security Administration ===
On April 12, 2018, President Trump announced his intention to nominate Saul to be Commissioner of Social Security, for the remainder of a six-year term expiring January 19, 2019, and for an additional six-year term expiring January 19, 2025. The nomination drew sharp criticism from Social Security and disability advocacy groups because of his involvement with the right-wing Manhattan Institute, which has repeatedly called for cuts to Social Security benefits. His lack of experience with Social Security and the accusation that he impersonated a police chief while trespassing on his bicycle were also brought into question. On January 3, 2019, his nomination was returned to the President under Rule XXXI, Paragraph 6 of the United States Senate. He was renominated on January 22, 2019, for the remainder of a six-year term expiring January 19, 2025. On March 26, 2019, his nomination was reported out of committee favorably by the Senate Committee on Finance. On June 4, 2019, the Senate confirmed his nomination by a vote of 77–16.

On June 17, 2019, Saul was officially sworn in as the Commissioner of Social Security at the agency's offices in Washington, D.C.

The first FEVS report issued under Saul shows SSA dropped two ranks in the annual Best Places to Work in the Federal Government list. The Agency dropped from 12th out of 17, to 14th. Per the official government report, SSA employees listed, among other reasons for the decline, a lack of confidence in leadership.

==== Termination and reinstatement of remote work policies ====
During his first months in office, Saul ended the six-year remote work policies for nearly 12,000 employees. It was effectively negated as the COVID-19 pandemic forced the return and expansion of the program for nearly the entirety of the SSA in March 2020.

==== Removal ====
On July 9, 2021, Saul was removed from his position as commissioner by President Joe Biden, after he refused a request to resign. Saul said his discharge was illegal, despite two recent Supreme Court precedents saying that the president does have the authority to fire the head of an independent agency.

Saul also responded by comparing his termination to the attorneys fired in Nixon's "Saturday Night Massacre", and that he would continue to do his job remotely, pointing out that his six-year term would not expire until 2025. He insisted on a return to work the following Monday, but was denied access to SSA systems when he tried to log-on remotely from home on July 12. Biden appointed Kilolo Kijakazi as Acting Commissioner.

== Personal life ==
He and his wife Denise have two daughters, one of whom, Jennifer, was the chairwoman of the Manhattan Republican Party from 2007 to 2011. His father suffered a stroke in 1996, and Saul became the primary caregiver. Joseph Saul died in 2007.

== Additional reading ==
- Arnold, R. Douglas, Graetz, Michael, Munnell, Alicia Haydock. Framing the Social Security Debate: Values, Politics, and Economics, Washington D.C.: Brookings Institution Press, 1998, ISBN 0-8157-0153-5.
- Brandon, Laura. Art and War, London: I. B. Tauris, 2006, ISBN 1-84511-237-7.
- Hughes, Gerald & Stewart, Jim. The Role of the State in Pension Provision: Employer, Regulator, Provider, New York: Springer, 1999, ISBN 0-7923-8433-4.
- Hustead, Edwin C. & Mitchell, Olivia S. Pensions in the Public Sector, Philadelphia: University of Pennsylvania Press, 2000, ISBN 0-8122-3578-9.
- Michel, Christopher. The Military Advantage: A Comprehensive Guide to Your Military & Veterans Benefits, New York: Simon & Schuster, 2005, ISBN 0-7432-6946-2.
- Niss, Barbara. This House of Noble Deeds: The Mount Sinai Hospital, 1852–2002, New York: NYU Press, 2002, ISBN 0-8147-0500-6.
- Stegman, Michael. Savings for the Poor: The Hidden Benefits of Electronic Banking, New York: Brookings Institution Press, 1999, ISBN 0-8157-8093-1.
- Sullivan, Michael. Your thrift savings plan, Reston: Federal Employees News Digest, 1999, ISBN 0-910582-24-6.
- Turner, John. Individual Accounts for Social Security Reform: International Perspective on the U.S.Debate, Kalamazoo: W. E. Upjohn Institute for Employment Research, 2005, ISBN 0-88099-283-2.
- United States Congress. House. Committee on Government Reform. Subcommittee on the Federal Workforce and Agency Organization. H.R. 1578, Real Estate Investment Trusts (REITs): Can They Improve the Thrift Savings Plan, Washington D.C.: U.S. G.P.O., 2005, ISBN 0-16-075394-5.
- United States Congress. House. Committee on Government Reform. The Thrift Savings Plan: Putting Customers First?, Washington D.C.: U.S. G.P.O., 2003.
- United States Congress. Senate. Committee on Governmental Affairs. Subcommittee on Financial Management, the Budget, and International Security. Oversight of the Thrift Savings Plan: Ensuring the Integrity of Federal Employee Retirement, Washington D.C.: U.S. G.P.O., 2004, ISBN 0-16-073524-6.

Political offices
Preceded by James Atkins	Chair of the Federal Retirement Thrift Investment Board; 2002–2011	Succeeded by Michael Kennedy
Preceded by Gerald Smith	Vice Chair of the Metropolitan Transportation Authority; 2006–2013	Succeeded by Fernando Ferrer
Preceded by Nancy Berryhill; Acting	Commissioner of the Social Security Administration; 2019–2021	Succeeded by Kilolo Kijakazi; Acting
