= Arthur E. Hess =

Arthur Hess
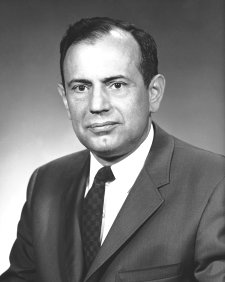

Commissioner of the Social Security Administration
- Acting
- In office March 18, 1973 – October 24, 1973
- President: Richard Nixon
- Preceded by: Robert M. Ball
- Succeeded by: James B. Cardwell

Personal details
- Born: June 18, 1916 Reading, Pennsylvania, U.S.
- Died: November 15, 2005 (aged 89) Charlottesville, Virginia, U.S.
- Education: Princeton University (BA); University of Maryland, Baltimore (LLB)
- Awards: President's Award for Distinguished Federal Civilian Service (1967)

Arthur E. Hess (June 18, 1916 – November 15, 2005), former acting commissioner of the Social Security Administration, was born in Reading, Pennsylvania. Hess graduated from Princeton University in 1939 and received a law degree from the University of Maryland in 1948. Shortly after graduating from Princeton, he took his first government job as a field representative for the Social Security Administration.

Hess oversaw the expansion of the government's retirement benefits program into both disability benefits and medical insurance during the middle of the 20th century. Hess was named as the director of the Bureau of Health Insurance in 1965, placing him as the first executive in charge of the Medicare program. At the time, the program provided health insurance to 19 million Americans.

Called "Mr. Medicare," he was praised for bringing together private insurers, hospitals and government agencies to make the program successful, according to news reports at the time. In 1967, he was promoted to the position of deputy commissioner of the Social Security Administration and served as acting commissioner for several months in 1973. He retired in 1974. In 1967, he was awarded the President's Award for Distinguished Federal Civilian Service, the highest award bestowed on federal career employees. He was also a founding member of the National Academy of Social Insurance. In 1967 Hess won the President's Award for Distinguished Federal Civilian Service and the National Civil Service League Award. In 1969 he won the Rockefeller's Public Service Award.

Hess died in November 2005.

Political offices
Preceded by Robert M. Ball	Commissioner of the Social Security Administration; Acting; 1973	Succeeded by James B. Cardwell
