= Retirement, Survivors, Disability Insurance =

Retirement, Survivors, Disability Insurance (RSDI) or Title II system was part of Franklin D. Roosevelt's New Deal during the Great Depression.

The insurance took to the form of social security payments for widows with a family to support, disabled people and others in need of money who were not able to support themselves. It was enacted in 1935.

The term is sometimes used interchangeably with Old-Age, Survivors, and Disability Insurance (OASDI), another name for Social Security (United States).
