= War Is a Racket =

1930s speech and book by Smedley D. Butler

- 1935 cover from the first printing
- Author: Smedley D. Butler (Major general (Ret.), USMC)
- Language: English
- Subject: Military–industrial complex; Morality; Warfare
- Publisher: Round Table Press
- Publication date: 1935
- Publication place: United States
- Pages: 51 (first edition)
- ISBN: 9780922915866
- OCLC: 3015073
- Dewey Decimal: 172.4
- LC Class: HB195 .B8

War Is a Racket is a speech and a 1935 short book by Smedley D. Butler, a retired United States Marine Corps major general and two-time Medal of Honor recipient. Based on his career military experience, Butler discusses how business interests commercially benefit from warfare. He had been appointed commanding officer of the Gendarmerie during the 1915–1934 United States occupation of Haiti.

After Butler retired from the US Marine Corps in October 1931, he made a nationwide tour in the early 1930s giving his speech "War Is a Racket". The speech was so well received that he wrote a longer version as a short book published in 1935. His work was condensed in Reader's Digest as a book supplement, which helped popularize his message. In an introduction to the Reader's Digest version, Lowell Thomas, who wrote Butler's oral autobiography, praised Butler's "moral as well as physical courage".

== Contents ==
In War Is a Racket, Butler points to a variety of examples, mostly from World War I, where industrialists, whose operations were subsidized by public funding, were able to generate substantial profits, making money from mass human suffering.

The work is divided into five chapters:

1. War is a racket
2. Who makes the profits?
3. Who pays the bills?
4. How to smash this racket!
5. To hell with war!

It contains this summary:

War is a racket. It always has been. It is possibly the oldest, easily the most profitable, surely the most vicious. It is the only one international in scope. It is the only one in which the profits are reckoned in dollars and the losses in lives. A racket is best described, I believe, as something that is not what it seems to the majority of the people. Only a small "inside" group knows what it is about. It is conducted for the benefit of the very few, at the expense of the very many. Out of war a few people make huge fortunes.

Butler confesses that during his decades of service in the United States Marine Corps:

I helped make Mexico, especially Tampico, safe for American oil interests in 1914. I helped make Haiti and Cuba a decent place for the National City Bank boys to collect revenues in. I helped in the raping of half a dozen Central American republics for the benefits of Wall Street. The record of racketeering is long. I helped purify Nicaragua for the international banking house of Brown Brothers in 1909–1912 (where have I heard that name before?). I brought light to the Dominican Republic for American sugar interests in 1916. In China I helped see to it that Standard Oil went its way unmolested. Looking back on it, I might have given Al Capone a few hints. The best he could do was to operate his racket in three districts. I operated on three continents.

=== Recommendations ===
In the booklet's penultimate chapter, Butler recommends three steps to disrupt the war racket:

1. Making war unprofitable. Butler suggests that the means for war should be "conscripted" before those who would fight the war:
  It can be smashed effectively only by taking the profit out of war. The only way to smash this racket is to conscript capital and industry and labour before the nation's manhood can be conscripted. […] Let the officers and the directors and the high-powered executives of our armament factories and our steel companies and our munitions makers and our ship-builders and our airplane builders and the manufacturers of all other things that provide profit in war time as well as the bankers and the speculators, be conscripted — to get $30 a month, the same wage as the lads in the trenches get.
2. Acts of war to be decided by those who fight it. He also suggests a limited referendum to determine if the war is to be fought. Eligible to vote would be those who risk death on the front lines.
3. Limitation of militaries to self-defense. For the United States, Butler recommends that the Navy be limited, by law, to operating within 200 miles (320 km) of the coastline, and the Army restricted to the territorial limits of the country, ensuring that war, if fought, can never be one of aggression.

== See also ==
- 1930s in the United States
- Antimilitarism vs Militarism
- Arms industry
- Banana Wars
- Business Plot
- Confessions of an Economic Hit Man
- Effects of economic inequality
- Global policeman
- Labor camp
- Mercenary
- Merchants of death
- Militarization
- Military–industrial complex
- Perpetual war
- Privatization
- Veterans for Peace
