= Paul Comly French =

American journalist

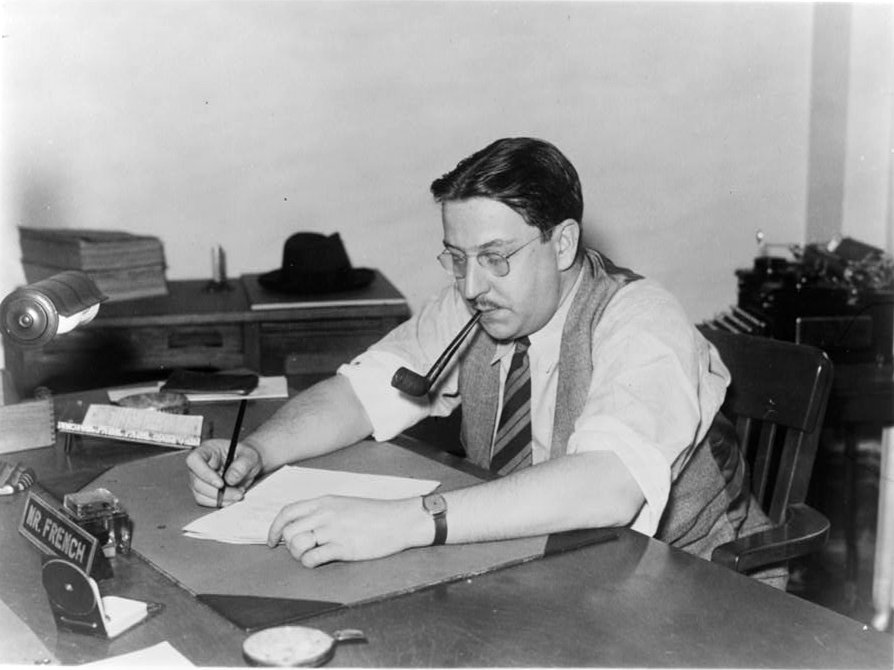
Paul Comly French as State Director of the Pennsylvania Unit, W.P.A. Federal Writers' Project

Paul Comly French (March 19, 1903 – June 3, 1960) was an American reporter, writer, anti-war activist and non-profit executive.

== Early life and career ==
Paul C. French was born in Philadelphia, Pennsylvania, to a Quaker family. He was a writer for The Philadelphia Record newspaper. He was married twice; first to Marie who died in 1943 and left him with two sons Paul and Peter. His second wife was Dorothy, with whom he had a son Bruce and daughter Susan. His brother Charles C. French was also a writer and a professor.

As a reporter he covered the Lindbergh kidnapping for the Philadelphia Record in 1932. It was to French, who was then writing both for the Record and the New York Post, that former General Smedley Butler in 1934 shared his allegations of a Business Plot to depose President Roosevelt.

== Federal Writers' Project in Pennsylvania ==
French was initially the assistant to the first director of the Pennsylvania Writers' Project (PWP), Logan B. Sisson. The project began in July 1935. French replaced Sisson within the year.

French’s term was marred by an acrimonious relationship with Henry Alsberg the national director of the Federal Writers' Project and, among all the state directors, was one of the few to constantly balk at the editorial dictates of the Washington staff. In a letter dated June 23, 1939, French appealed to the executive director of Pennsylvania’s Historical Commission, Maj. Frank Melvin, for assistance in convincing Alsberg to finally publish the state’s guide. He accused the national office of being overly concerned with details, citing “the copy cannot be considered final because our margins are an inch and a quarter, instead of an inch, and our indents for paragraphs are ten rather than five spaces.” French was also unable to broker a truce between the Newspaper Guild and the Writers Union, two leftwing labor organizations with writers on the PWP staff that eventually conspired to oust French in 1939.

By the summer of 1939, shifting political winds had left the Federal Writers' Project out to dry. The previous year, both the Dies Committee to Investigate Un-American Activities and the House appropriations committee attacked the Federal Writers' Project for being a hotbed of Communism, accusations based mainly on the radical leanings of some writers in the project’s frenetic New York City office. Alsberg successfully defended the FWP from the trumped-up charges, but negative publicity during the hearings left a bitter aftertaste in the public’s mind.

== Conscientious Objector National Leader ==
He was the first Executive Secretary for the National Service Board for Religious Objection and served from 1940 until 1947. The National Service Board for Religious Objectors (NSBRO) was a voluntary association of religious organizations which acted as a voice for the churches and conscientious objectors to the Selective Service System in the United States in matters regarding the administration of the draft of conscientious objectors. It was created on 26 November 1940 as a merger of the short-lived National Council for Religious Objectors (NCRO) with the Civilian Service Board. The NCRO had been established on 11 October 1940 by joint action of the Mennonite Central Committee, the American Friends Service Committee, and the Brethren Service Committee.

The function of the NSBRO was to serve as the liaison between the churches and other groups having conscientious objectors to military service among their members. Although it did not administer any Civilian Public Service (CPS) projects or camps, it performed a valuable service. It was not the sole channel to the National Selective Service office for those groups who administered CPS, since they could and did on occasion deal directly with Selective Service, but it nevertheless carried most of the liaison work. For this purpose it was organized into the following sections: Camp Section, Complaint Section, and Assignment Section. The Camp Section worked in connection with the selection of sites for CPS camps; the Complaint Section helped men who were not properly classified or were denied their claim to conscientious objector status; the Assignment Section was the channel for transmitting the assignment to the proper CPS camp for the COs who were being drafted.

== Executive director of CARE ==
In 1947 French became executive director of CARE after having served as general manager for several months. CARE (originally "Cooperative for American Remittances to Europe", and later "Cooperative for Assistance and Relief Everywhere"), was founded in 1945 with the idea to secure financial backing for overseas food relief packages for a devastated Europe. The relief came in "CARE Packages", which were U.S. Army surplus 10-in-1 food parcels left over from the planned U.S. invasion of Japan. The service let Americans send the packages to friends and families in Europe. Each CARE Package cost $10 and was guaranteed to reach its addressee within four months. In 1955 Paul French left CARE and founded a new non-profit organization called World.Inc. Paul French died on June 3, 1960.

== Writings ==
- Common Sense Neutrality: Mobilizing for Peace (Hastings House, New York 1939)
- We Won't Murder: The History of Non-Violence (Hastings House, Ney York 1940)
- "Alternative Service Program for Canadian C.O.s" by Paul Comly French, 09/26/1944
