= Butler House (West Chester, Pennsylvania) =

Historic house in Pennsylvania, United States

- U.S. National Register of Historic Places
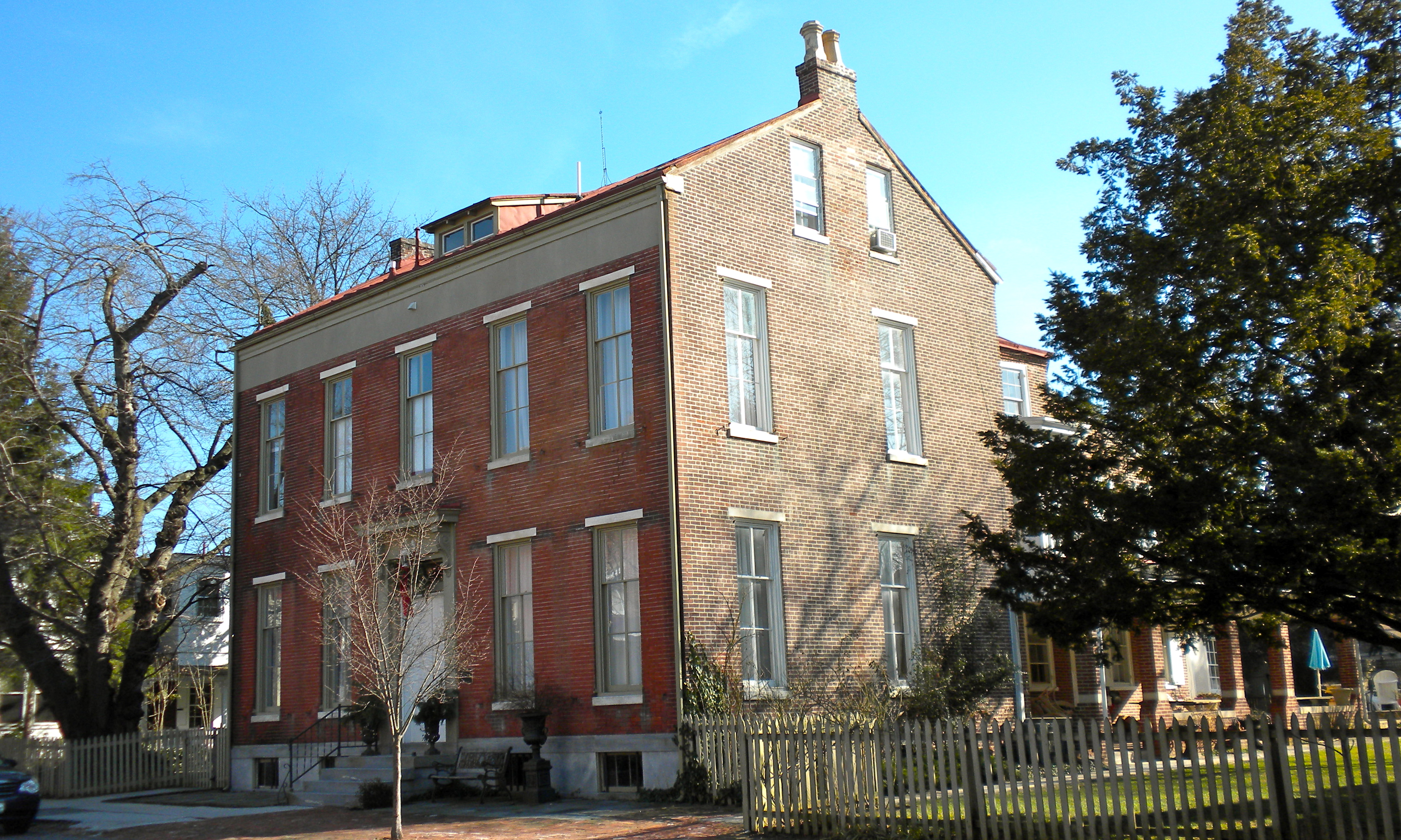
- Butler House, January 2010

- Location within Pennsylvania Location within the United States
- Location: 228 W. Miner St., West Chester, Pennsylvania
- Coordinates: 39°56′58″N 75°35′50″W
- Area: 0.4 acres (0.16 ha)
- Built: c. 1845
- Architectural style: Federal
- NRHP reference No.: 80003470
- Added to NRHP: July 23, 1980

Butler House is a historic home located in West Chester, Chester County, Pennsylvania. It was built about 1845, and is a 2 1/2-story brick dwelling in the Federal style. It has a rear ell with porch. The house has been renovated into apartments. It was the home of Congressman Thomas S. Butler (1855–1928), father of U.S. Marine Corps Maj. Gen. Smedley Butler (1881–1940). Maj. Gen. Butler grew up in the house.

It was listed on the National Register of Historic Places in 1980.
