= Perpetual war =

Lasting state of war with no clear ending conditions

A perpetual war, endless war or forever war is a lasting state of war with no clear conditions that would lead to its conclusion. These wars are usually situations of ongoing tension that may escalate at any moment, similar to the Cold War. From the late 20th century, the concepts have been used to critique the United States Armed Forces interventions in foreign nations and the military–industrial complex such as the Vietnam War and the Soviet-Afghan War, or wars with ambiguous enemies such as the war on terror and war on drugs.

== Causes ==
Poor military planning is one of the major reasons that a forever war can occur. If the territory gained in a war is not occupied or controlled properly, this can allow a deadly insurgency to occur, potentially stretching out a conflict that never ends. As of 2018, the United States has an inflation-adjusted military budget that is greater than its budget for World War II, which enables it to fight continuously in Iraq and other countries.

Civil wars are prone to military stalemate which can prolong the war indefinitely. A lack of democracy is associated with an increased risk of civil war.

Forever wars can occur in order to keep money flowing into institutions, such as the military–industrial–congressional complex (MICC). Thus, forever wars can serve as domestic political engines, as policy makers promote policies of continuing and expanding wars.

Forever wars can be to the benefit of small armed groups, who may achieve political goals by wearing down a larger group or country. For example, in the aftermath of the 9/11 attacks and the beginning of the war on terror, Al-Qaeda aimed to involve the United States in a prolonged guerrilla war in Afghanistan, challenging its will to fight such a long war.

Wars between ethnic or ideological groups can become forever wars, as such wars are harder to end with a negotiated peace deal due to the different interests of the two sides. An additional barrier may arise in the case of religious wars if one or both parties believe that the other must be destroyed.

== In current events ==
There are current examples of nearly perpetual war, such as the Myanmar conflict and the Israeli–Palestinian conflict, which have both been ongoing for over 75 years. These conflicts are typically characterized by long periods of low-intensity conflict interspersed with shorter periods of intense fighting. In a less literal sense, the term has been applied to superpowers who engage in constant hostile military activity around the world. As their militaries are always engaged in combat, it could be said that these countries are in a state of perpetual war, albeit not necessarily one that their citizens experience on a daily basis. In particular, much has been written on the activities of United States.

The concept of a perpetual war has been used since opposition to United States involvement in the Vietnam War. James Pinckney Harrison argues in The Endless War: Fifty Years of Struggle in Vietnam (1981) that the Vietnam War was "endless" due to the success of the communist revolution in nationalizing the people. The concept was used by Trần Văn Đôn, a general in the Army of the Republic of Vietnam, in his book Our Endless War: Inside Vietnam (1978).

American historian James Chace argues in his book Endless War: How we got involved in Central America (1983) that US policy in Central America is based upon the assumption that US hegemony is threatened within the region. According to Chace, US involvement in Central America worked towards resisting the domino effect of the spread of a "communist take-over", largely through establishing the credibility of US military. Though these policies were meant to deter conflict, they themselves created the conditions for instability in the region, which furthered a US response. This resulted in a self-perpetuating, or "endless", loop. He additionally argues US investment in pursuing an expanding military presence in Central America reflects an endless preparation for war.

A key argument of Chace is that much of this military involvement stems from a logic of US paranoia in reaction to the Cuban Revolution. A similar argument is put forward by David Keen, political economist and Professor of Complex Emergencies at the London School of Economics. His book Endless War? Hidden Function of the 'War on Terror' (2006) argues that the United States' strategies and tactics in the war on terror use a "militaristic state-cased framework". This framework, though "counterproductive", has an "inner logic" and a "psychological function" of responding to the trauma of September 11 attacks.

Noam Chomsky posits that a state of perpetual war is an aid to (and is often promoted by) the dominant political and economic classes, that assists them in maintaining their positions of economic and political superiority.

The British journalist Robert Fisk (1946 – 2020), who was a critic of Western policies in the Middle East, argued that Western conflicts against the Middle East after the end of the Cold War have been part of a new perpetual war. He suggested that former U.S. President George H. W. Bush launched attacks on Iraq, Sudan, and Afghanistan to distract the population from his domestic political problems. In addition, he claimed that despite victorious claims after the first Gulf War that Saddam Hussein had been "defanged", he was again the target of Western attacks until his execution in 2006.

Similarly, Ted Koppel described the war on terror as "Our Children's Children's War". Political commentators have used this concept in reference to non-military "wars", such as the "war on drugs", "War on Poverty", "war on cancer", Lou Dobbs's "War on the Middle Class", the "war on terrorism", the "war on women", or Bill O'Reilly's "war on Christmas".

== In socioeconomics and politics ==
The economic make-up of the 5th century BC Athens-led Delian League also bears resemblance to the economic ramifications of preparing for perpetual war. The British Empire and its power sharing agreements with domestic businesses that were owned by a wealthy minority of individuals, such as the East India Company, the Hudson's Bay Company, and De Beers, manifest an observed relationship between a minority of individuals influencing Empire or State policy, such as the Child's War in India, the Anglo-Mysore Wars in India, the Anglo-French conflicts on Hudson Bay in Canada, and the Second Boer War in South Africa, follow a pattern where the Empire allocates resources pursuing and sustaining policies that financially profit the Empire's domestic business's owners.

=== Military–industrial complex ===
The idea that military action can be seen as a form of market-creation goes back at least as far as speeches beginning in 1930 prior to the publication of War Is a Racket in 1935. On January 16, 1961, President Eisenhower delivered his farewell speech expressing great concern for the direction of the newfound armaments industry post-WWII. While recognizing the boom in economic growth after the war, he reminded the people of United States that this was a way of profiting off warfare and that if not regulated enough it could lead to the "grave" expansion of the armaments industry. He said, "The potential for the disastrous rise of misplaced power exists and will persist." Eisenhower feared that the military–industrial complex could lead to a state of perpetual war as the big armament industry will continue to profit from warfare. Additionally, NSC 68 can be used as a reference to understand U.S. President Harry S. Truman's reasoning for the continued build up the United States' nuclear arsenal and how this contributed to the Cold War. This concept is still present in today's policies as William D. Hartung states in his article "The Doctrine of Armed Exceptionalism".

=== War on terror ===
Traditionally, the term "war" referred to the physical and conventional act of engaging in armed conflict. However, the implications of what war entails have evolved over time. The war on terror has often been cited as a perpetual war, being a war with "no specific battlefield and the enemy isn't an army." The war on terror has been directed at countless "enemies," as it has no clear target. Georgetown University Historian Bruce Hoffman describes traditional war as a war that "ends with the vanquishing of an opponent, with some form or armistice or truce- some kind of surrender instrument or document." In contrast, the war on terror continues with no end in sight.

The war on terror was declared in 2001 by President George W. Bush, following the September 11 attacks, but as early as 1996, Osama bin Laden of Al-Qaeda made a threat to the United States, by making a declaration of war. The growing tensions of the Middle East are suggested by Laurence Andrew Dobrot to be very wide cultural misunderstandings and faults the West for not making peace with the Middle East. As the deputy director for the Missile Defense Agency's Airborne Laser Program, Dobrot examines the hostility which has been continuous not only since 2001, but since the birth of Wahhabism.

Dobrot proposed that the U.S should recognize the cultural hostility of the tribal Arabs in order to make the first steps towards progression of making peace.

The Crusades arose as European expansion was growing at the peak of unified Islamic dominance. On September 16, 2001, in a speech, President Bush referred to the war on terror as a crusade. He said:

No one could have conceivably imagined suicide bombers burrowing into our society and then emerging all in the same day to fly their aircraft - fly U.S. aircraft into buildings full of innocent people - and show no remorse. This is a new kind of -- a new kind of evil. And we understand. And the American people are beginning to understand. This crusade, this war on terrorism is going to take a while. And the American people must be patient. I'm going to be patient.

Andrew Bacevich described Bush's naming of the war on terror as a crusade as something which does not make the war separate, rather something that shows that it is part of an "eternal war."

=== War memorials ===
With the advent of perpetual war, communities have begun to construct war memorials with names of the dead while the wars are ongoing. The Northwood Gratitude and Honor Memorial in Irvine, California was dedicated in 2010 to American troops who lost their lives in the wars in Iraq and Afghanistan, with space for 8,000 names (approximately 4,500 used at time of construction) and the intention to update it yearly.

== Views of influential writers ==
=== Sun Tzu ===
Ancient war advisor Sun Tzu expressed views in the 6th century BC about perpetual war. The following quotation from chapter 2, Waging War, of his book The Art of War suggests the negative impacts of prolonged war:

Sun Tzu said: ... When you engage in actual fighting, if victory is long in coming, the men's weapons will grow dull and their ardour will be damped. If you lay siege to a town, you will exhaust your strength ... There is no instance of a country having benefited from prolonged warfare ... In war, then, let your great object be victory, not lengthy campaigns.

=== Alexis de Tocqueville ===
Historian Alexis de Tocqueville made predictions in 1840 concerning perpetual war in democratic countries. The following is from Volume 2, chapter 22, "Why Democratic Nations Naturally Desire Peace and Democratic Armies, War", 18th paragraph, in his book, Democracy in America:

No protracted war can fail to endanger the freedom of a democratic country. Not indeed that after every victory it is to be apprehended that the victorious generals will possess themselves by force of the supreme power, after the manner of Sulla and Caesar; the danger is of another kind. War does not always give over democratic communities to military government, but it must invariably and immeasurably increase the powers of civil government; it must almost compulsorily concentrate the direction of all men and the management of all things in the hands of the administration. If it does not lead to despotism by sudden violence, it prepares men for it more gently by their habits. All those who seek to destroy the liberties of a democratic nation ought to know that war is the surest and the shortest means to accomplish it. This is the first axiom of the science.

== Fiction ==
- In George Orwell's novel Nineteen Eighty-Four, the three superstates of the world, Eurasia, Oceania and Eastasia, are said to be in a perpetual state of war with each other. The attacks are in the form of rocket attacks (similar to the V2 Attacks on London in WW2) although it is implied in the book that the attacks could be launched by the home Government against their own people in order to perpetuate fear and hatred of the enemy. Therefore, perpetual war may in fact secretly be a strategy used by the state to continuously promote its own political agenda. However, the military attacks are limited to the non-aligned areas (North and Central Africa, India etc.), an example of this is The Malabar Front (India) where Oceania won a victory against Eurasia.
- In the Doctor Who series Genesis of the Daleks, the Kaleds and the Thals are in a perpetual state of war and have been for 1000 years. This state of war finally results in both sides occupying one city each on either side of mountains, and leads to both sides' supplies being so completely ravaged by the war that both sides have a collection of black powder weapons, modern and futuristic weapons and armour. It is out of this war that the Daleks are created by Davros.
- In the Doctor Who series, the Sontarans and the Rutans have been in a perpetual state of war for over 50,000 years. There appears to be no end in sight, with each side continually attempting to completely obliterate the other. This has resulted in either side constantly gaining and losing territory (including the Milky Way galaxy, which is known in Doctor Who as the "Mutter's Spiral").
- In Doctor Who in Destiny of the Daleks, the Daleks and the Movellans have basically been drawn into an Endless War, due to their battle computers both giving a logical set of orders, only to have one set countered by the other battle computer with an equally logical set of orders. As both sides are using logical instructions, neither side could win as both sides would be able to counter the advances of the other as both were using logic. The Daleks returned to Skaro to find Davros to see if he could give them an advantage. The Movellans tried to get the Doctor to give them the same advantage.
- In the 2000AD series Rogue Trooper, the North (Norts) and South (Southers) of the Planet Nu-Earth, for hundreds of years, have been in a perpetual state of war against each other using conventional, biological, chemical, and nuclear weapons. The length of the war as well as the weapons involved have turned the planet uninhabitable without protective suits. It was for this reason that the Southers created the GIs or Genetic Infantry which would be able to survive in the environment.
- Joe Haldeman's The Forever War is about a war that is made perpetual due to the Einsteinian time dilation effects due to space travel. The novel is said to have been shaped by Haldeman's experience in the Vietnam War as the book contains references to the war paired up with sci-fi concepts. A quote by Haldeman shows great influence from Hobbes' concept of perpetual war, "Life begins in a bloody mess and sometimes it ends the same way, and only odd people seek out blood between those times, maybe crazy people."
- In the original Star Trek episode "A Taste of Armageddon", the neighboring planets of Eminiar and Vendikar have been at war for 500 years. To avoid the physical devastation of an actual war, the belligerents agreed to conduct only computer-simulated attacks as long as the resulting "victims" voluntarily kill themselves in "disintegration stations".
- The 2006 film Children of Men displays themes of perpetual war by exploring the wars on Terror and Poverty. The movie is set in a dystopia suffering universal infertility. The social and political world has become chaotic as few people exercise social power from their wealthy positions. Meanwhile, there is constant conflict all around the world, which specifically the oppressed group suffers. Manohla Dargis of The New York Times takes notice to the norm of bombs casually exploding in public places, such as a cafe. Dargis writes, "It imagines the unthinkable: What if instead of containing Iraq, the world has become Iraq, a universal battleground of military control, security zones, refugee camps and warring tribal identities?"
- In the 1980s Japanese novel series Legend of the Galactic Heroes, the autocratic and quasi-feudal Galactic Empire and the democratic (on the surface only, in practice just as autocratic) Free Planets Alliance have been at a perpetual war with each other ever since the establishment of the latter in 3327 AD. The novel series starts at 3598 AD, which implies that the war has been going on for 271 years at that point.
- In the 1995 anime film Memories, the third segment, "Cannon Fodder", is about a walled city whose entire society is built around producing weapons for an endless war they are in. Despite propaganda emphasizing the threat of the enemy, there is no visual confirmation that this is true, or even if there is an enemy at all.

== See also ==
- Arab–Israeli conflict
- Attrition warfare
- Endemic warfare
- Just war
- List of ongoing armed conflicts
- List of wars extended by diplomatic irregularity
- Permanent war economy
- Perpetual peace
- Rogue state
- Roman–Persian Wars, noted for being "never-ending" by classical authors
- Si vis pacem, para bellum
- Syrian civil war
- The Report from Iron Mountain
- War as metaphor
- War Is a Racket
