= Grayson M. P. Murphy =

American military officer, banker and company director

Grayson M.-P. Murphy
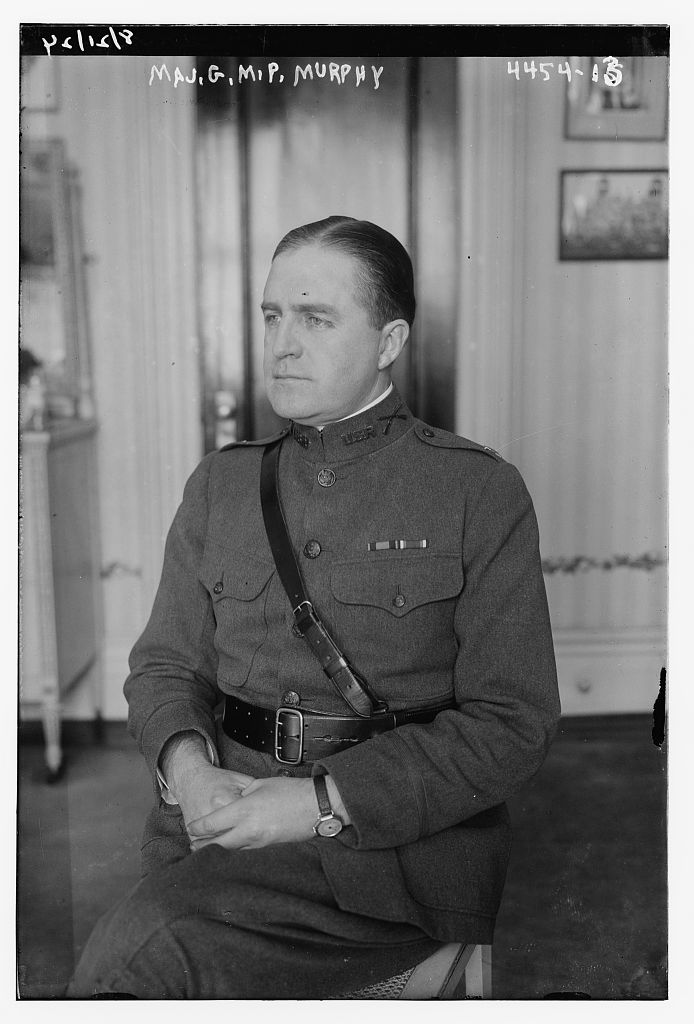
- Murphy in 1918
- Born: Grayson Mallet-Prevost Murphy Sr. December 19, 1878; Philadelphia, Pennsylvania, U.S.
- Died: October 18, 1937 (aged 58); New York City, New York, U.S.
- Education: Haverford College; United States Military Academy (BS)

Grayson Mallet-Prevost Murphy Sr. (December 19, 1878 – October 18, 1937) was an American military officer, banker and company director.

== Early life ==
Murphy was born on December 19, 1878, in Philadelphia, Pennsylvania to Howard and Anita Mallet-Prevost Murphy. He attended Haverford College where he was a member of the class of 1900. While there, he served on the board of The Haverfordian, the school's literary magazine. He also authored the sophomore play for his class, a play in three acts set, respectively, in Pluto's court, Hades and by the River Styx; he played the role of Venus.

== Early military career ==
After two years at Haverford, Murphy left "at the first call for troops" after the Spanish-American War broke out; on April 28, 1898, he enlisted as a private in Company "D", First Regiment, Pennsylvania Volunteer Infantry. By Special Order 129 of the Adjutant General's Office, at the request of the Governor of Pennsylvania, he accepted a commission on the staff of Brigadier General Morrell of the National Guard of Pennsylvania.

Murphy was sent to Chattanooga, Tennessee where he "received a staff appointment of Captain," serving there for the summer. The Spanish-American War lasted only sixteen weeks so, once his services were no longer needed, Murphy resigned on October 17 upon appointment as Cadet to the United States Military Academy; he entered with the class of 1903 on June 10, 1899. While there, his "standing earned him appointments as Corporal, Sergeant, and Captain in the Corps of Cadets." He was noted for his "kind and amiable disposition" and among his most "distinguishing characteristic[s]" was "his love of humor and repartee." Among other activities, he served as one of six "Hop Managers", helping to organize weekend dances for his class.

Murphy graduated from West Point on June 11, 1903, 22nd out of a class of 94. He opted to join the Infantry and was posted to the 17th Regiment, then stationed in the Philippines.

From June 20-October 10, 1903, while on "graduation leave," Murphy was detailed on Special Duty with the Military Intelligence Division of The General Staff for duty in Panama and in Venezuela. He subsequently returned to the States and was on duty in the War Department in Washington, until December 20, 1903, when he sailed from New York to join his regiment in Jolo in the Philippines; he arrived there in March 1904.

Between March and November 1904, Murphy served in Jolo and on Mindanao. For four months, from November, 1904 - February, 1905, he was on Special Duty with the Military Intelligence Division in Manila. Subsequently, he rejoined his regiment and was placed on Special Duty in the field with the 14th Cavalry Regiment.

In August, 1905, Murphy returned to the United States with the 17th; the regiment was stationed at Fort McPherson, Atlanta, Georgia, and remained there until October, 1906, when it was ordered to Camagüey, Cuba. While in Cuba, Murphy served as an instructor in Law and History at the Military Academy; he returned to the United States in March, 1907.

For his service during this period, Murphy received the Philippine Service Medal and the Army of Cuban Pacification Medal.

== Early business career ==
In November 1907, Murphy resigned from the service and accepted an offer to become General Sales Manager of the Electric Cable Company. In 1915, he became vice president of the Guaranty Trust Company, but he resigned in 1917 in order to enter World War I.

== World War I ==
Murphy volunteered for active service and was commissioned as Major of Infantry, Officer Reserve Corps; he was subsequently called for active duty on May 31, 1917. However, just prior, he was appointed as the first American Red Cross Commissioner to Europe. Murphy had a "high metropolitan reputation as an organizer" and was one of President Wilson's first picks for the War Council of the American Red Cross. He accepted the assignment on one condition: "that when certain foundations had been laid and certain work accomplished, he should be free to return to the army," namely to active service.

As Commissioner to Europe, Murphy sailed for France on May 31. He arrived in France on June 13 with a staff of seventeen people; this number rapidly increased during his tenure to 2,375 persons working in France (1,325 paid workers and 1,050 volunteers) as Murphy expanded operations. In addition to operations in France, Murphy also oversaw Red Cross efforts in England, Serbia and Italy.

Under Murphy's stewardship, the Red Cross worked to support "nineteen American hospitals and numerous dispensaries, furnishing 15,851,000 francs to 288 French hospitals and relief organizations." He also oversaw the "founding [of] four convalescent homes for American troops, eighteen canteens to provide food and lodging for soldiers going to and returning from the trenches, three rest stations along the lines of communication for American troops, and five recreation huts for American troops in hospitals, supplying 3,700 French military hospitals with surgical dressings and other needed equipment, building a factory for the manufacture of artificial limbs, and establishing five relief centres in France and Belgium." In his final five months as Commissioner, the Red Cross provided medical care to 30,000 repatriated children and was feeding an average of 65,000 children daily.

On February 13, 1918, Murphy reported for duty to General Pershing after handing over his role as European Commissioner to Major James H. Perkins. He was promoted to Lieutenant Colonel on August 16 and served as Assistant Chief of Staff of the 42nd Division (Rainbow Division), in charge of operations. For his war work, he honored with the Victory Medal and the Army Distinguished Service Medal, as authorized by Congress on July 9, 1918. In recognition of his service, he also received the Order of Leopold II from Belgium and was made an Officer of the Legion of Honor by France and a Commendatore of the Order of the Crown of Italy.

== Later business career ==
At the conclusion of World War I, Murphy returned to Wall Street.

In 1921, he founded G.M.-P. Murphy & Co. which became a member of the New York Stock Exchange in 1925, going on to become "one of the largest brokerage houses in Wall Street." Murphy was "greatly interested in the rehabilitation of ailing businesses or in strengthening those already well-established" and his firm was "frequently retained to straighten out the affairs of companies in financial difficulties".

In April 1932, Murphy's firm consolidated with J.S. Wilson Jr. & Co., at which time the partners in the latter — J. Sawyer Wilson Jr. and Charles H. Baetjer — became general partners in Murphy's company.

The 1921 reorganization of The Goodyear Tire and Rubber Company led to one of Murphy's first directorships, one he retained until his death. Murphy also played a key role in the reorganization of United Cigar Stores and served as a director. Additionally, he served on the boards of directors of: the Anaconda Copper Mining Company, Bethlehem Steel, the Omnibus Corporation, the Fifth Avenue Coach Company, the American Ice Company, the Allis-Chalmers Manufacturing Company, the Royal Indemnity Company, The United States and Foreign Securities Corporation, The New York, Chicago and St. Louis Railroad Company, The Cuba Cane Sugar Corporation, the National Aviation Corporation, the Interlake Iron Corporation, and the Intercontinental Rubber Corporation, among others.

Additionally, Murphy served as chairman of "a protective committee for the secured debentures of Kreuger & Toll," taking part "in the efforts of international financiers to salvage values for the security holders out of the wrecked Kreuger holdings" after the company declared bankruptcy. His role in this effort included the Presidency and a directorship of The Kreutoll Realization Company, Limited. Murphy also served as chairman of the General Advisory Committee of Peruvian Bondholders, and led the Cable & Radio Users' Protective Committee.

== Personal life ==
In 1906, Murphy married Maud Donaldson of Philadelphia. Together, they had two sons: Grayson Mallet-Prevost Jr. and Robert Donaldson Murphy.

== Civic activities ==
In 1922, Murphy served as chairman of the Interborough Rapid Transit Company noteholders' committee in New York and was involved in "negotiations leading to the formulation of the transit unification plan which was agreed to by the representatives of the city administration, but which failed to obtain the approval of the Transit Commission."

He was also active on behalf of the Association Against the Prohibition Amendment. A "foe of prohibition," he testified in Washington before several committees, including an appearance before the Judiciary Committee of the House of Representatives in the 1930 hearings, during which he was "very outspoken." Murphy's "flat announcement that he violated the liquor laws of the [Twenties], and that he did not know anybody who did not, created a sensation in the days when such announcements were considered indiscreet."

Murphy was tangentially referenced in connection with the 1933 Business Plot alleged by General Smedley Butler to overthrow President Franklin Roosevelt in a military coup; due to insufficient evidence, no one was ever charged. The New York Times recounted in Murphy's obituary: "the plot was immediately shown to have been non-existent, at least so far as it involved any of the prominent persons named in it. Colonel Murphy was not accused of having anything to do with the alleged plot, but since one of the persons named as a conspirator was Gerald P. MacGuire, a bond salesman in his firm, he issued a complete denial and branded the plot report as a fantasy."

== Death ==
Murphy fell ill on October 8, 1937; at first, his illness did not seem serious and he was in daily communication with his office. However, on the night of the 15th, his condition worsened. He died three days later, on October 18, of bronchial pneumonia, in Manhattan, New York City. His funeral was held at St. James' Episcopal Church on October 20.
