= Thomas S. Butler =

American politician (1855–1928)

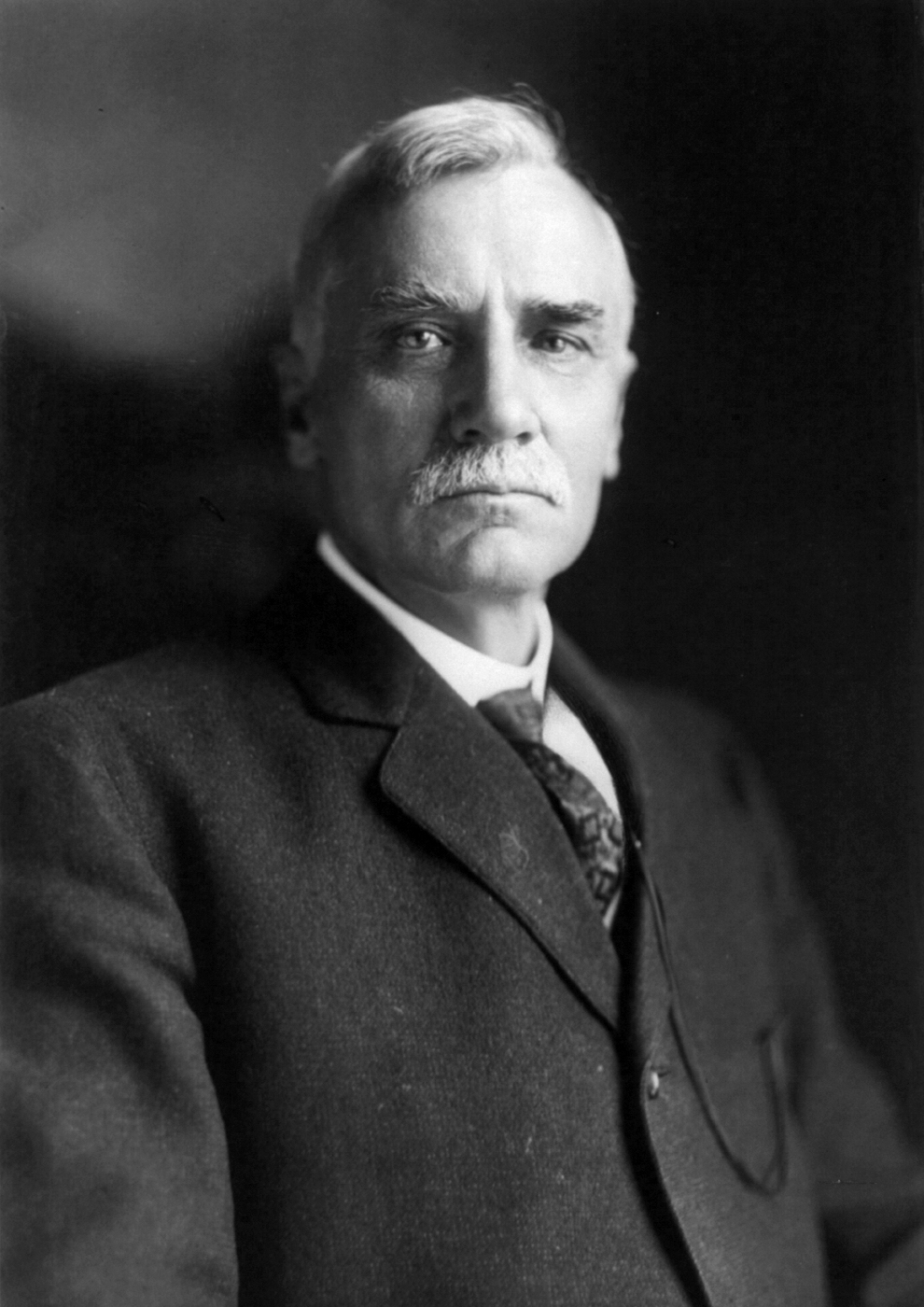
- Butler in 1913

Member of the U.S. House of Representatives from Pennsylvania
- In office March 4, 1897 – May 26, 1928
- Preceded by: John B. Robinson
- Succeeded by: James Wolfenden
- Constituency: 6th district (1897–1903); 7th district (1903–23); 8th district (1923–28)

Personal details
- Born: Thomas Stalker Butler; November 4, 1855 Uwchland Township, Pennsylvania, US
- Died: May 26, 1928 (aged 72) Washington, D.C., US
- Resting place: Oaklands Cemetery
- Party: Republican
- Children: Smedley Butler (son)
- Parent: Samuel Butler
- Education: West Chester University

Thomas Stalker Butler (November 4, 1855 – May 26, 1928) was an American politician who served as a U.S. representative from Pennsylvania from March 4, 1897, until his death, having been elected to the House sixteen times. He was the father of the Marine Corps Major General Smedley Butler. He was Dean of the United States House of Representatives.

== Early life ==
Butler was born in Uwchlan Township, Chester County, Pennsylvania. His father was Samuel Butler, a farmer and banker who served in the Pennsylvania House of Representatives and one term as Pennsylvania State Treasurer from 1880 to 1882. Thomas attended the common schools, West Chester State Normal School, and Wyer’s Academy in West Chester.

He later studied law, was admitted to the bar in 1877, and commenced practice in West Chester. From 1885 to 1889 and again in 1927-1928 he served as trustee of the West Chester State Normal School. Butler was appointed judge of the fifteenth judicial district of Pennsylvania in 1888.

== Political career ==
Butler stood as an unsuccessful candidate for reelection in 1889. He was a delegate to the Republican National Convention in 1892.

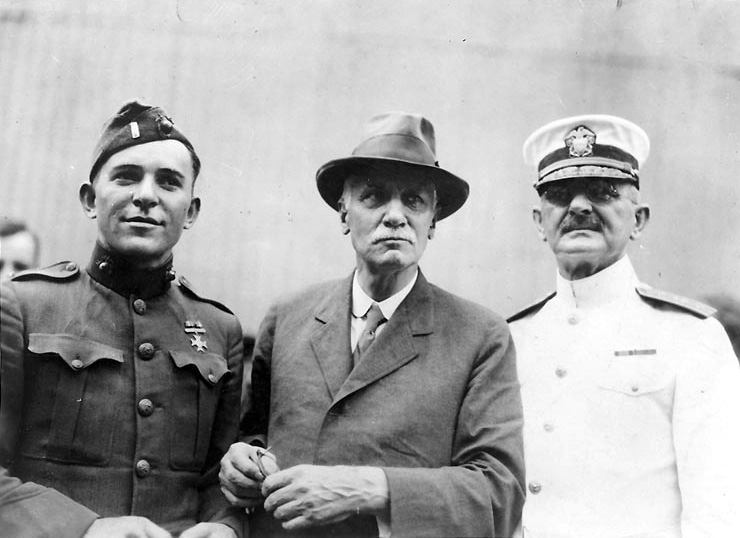
Thomas S. Butler, center, with U.S. Navy Admiral Henry T. Mayo and an unidentified Marine Lieutenant returning from France aboard USS Siboney in August 1919.

Elected to Congress in his first term as an Independent Republican, he was elected as a Republican for each succeeding term. While in Congress, he was chairman of the United States House Committee on Pacific Railroads (Fifty-ninth through Sixty-first Congresses) and member of the United States House Committee on Naval Affairs (Sixty-sixth through Seventieth Congresses).

During World War I, Butler read into the Congressional Record the "bogus oath", which was falsely attributed to the Roman Catholic fraternal organization Knights of Columbus, in which the oath taker pledges to war against Protestant Christians. The bogus oath was refuted by the Committee on Public Information, the wartime information agency of the Woodrow Wilson administration.

Butler died in office and was buried in Oaklands Cemetery, West Chester, Pennsylvania. His home at West Chester, The Butler House, was listed on the National Register of Historic Places in 1980.

== See also ==
- List of members of the United States Congress who died in office (1900–1949)

U.S. House of Representatives
Preceded by John B. Robinson	Member of the U.S. House of Representatives from Pennsylvania's 6th congressional district 1897–1903	Succeeded by George D. McCreary
Preceded by Irving P. Wanger	Member of the U.S. House of Representatives from Pennsylvania's 7th congressional district 1903–1923	Succeeded by George P. Darrow
Preceded by Henry W. Watson	Member of the U.S. House of Representatives from Pennsylvania's 8th congressional district 1923–1928	Succeeded by James Wolfenden
