= Smedley Butler =

United States Marine Corps officer, author, and lecturer (1881–1940)

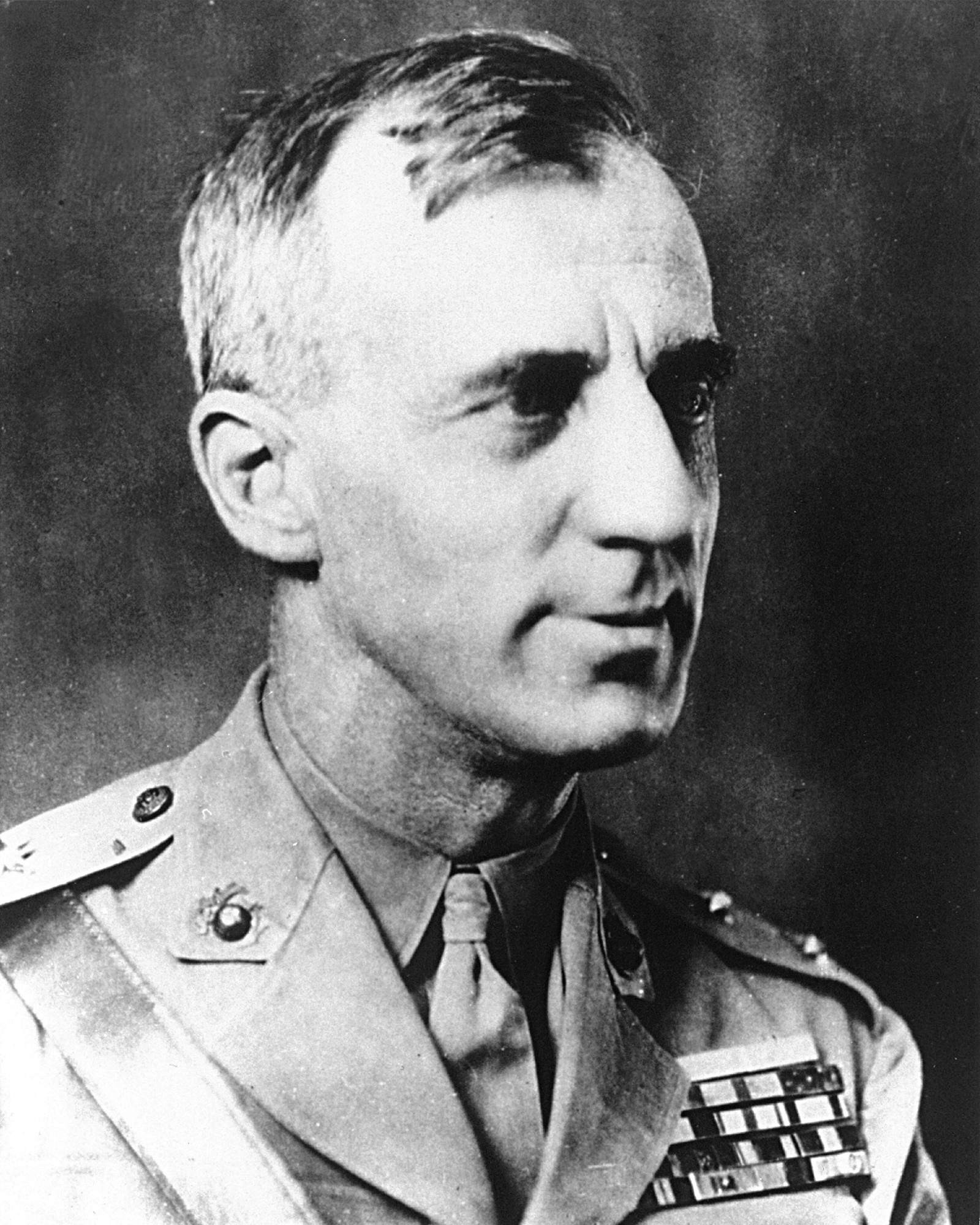
- Butler in c. 1929
- Born: Smedley Darlington Butler; July 30, 1881; West Chester, Pennsylvania, U.S.
- Died: June 21, 1940 (aged 58); Philadelphia, Pennsylvania, U.S.
- Relatives: Smedley Darlington (grandfather); Samuel Butler (grandfather); Thomas S. Butler (father); Isabel Darlington (aunt)
- Military career
- Allegiance: United States
- Branch: United States Marine Corps
- Service years: 1898–1931
- Rank: Major general
- Nicknames: "The Maverick Marine"; "Old Gimlet Eye"; "The Fighting Quaker"; "Fighting Hell-Devil"
- Commands: 3rd Battalion, 1st Marines; 13th Marines; Marine Barracks, Quantico; Marine Corps Base, San Diego; 3rd Marine Brigade; Marine Barracks, Quantico
- Conflicts: Spanish–American War; Philippine–American War; Boxer Rebellion; Battle of Tientsin (WIA); Banana Wars; Occupation of Nicaragua; Occupation of Veracruz; Occupation of Haiti; World War I; Defensive Sector
- Awards: Medal of Honor (2); Marine Corps Brevet Medal; Military Medal (Haiti); Commander of the Order of the Black Star (France); See more
- Other work: Lecturer, author, political activist

Director of Public Safety for Philadelphia
- In office January 7, 1924 – December 23, 1925

Major General Smedley Darlington Butler (July 30, 1881 – June 21, 1940) was a United States Marine Corps officer and, later, an anti-war advocate. During his 34-year military career, he fought in the Philippine–American War, the Boxer Rebellion, the Mexican Revolution, World War I, and the Banana Wars. At the time of his death, Butler was the most decorated Marine in U.S. military history. By the end of his career, Butler had received sixteen medals, including five for heroism; he was awarded the Marine Corps Brevet Medal as well as two Medals of Honor, both for separate actions.

In 1933, Butler claimed to have been approached to become involved in a controversy, the Business Plot, telling a United States congressional committee a group of wealthy American industrialists were planning a coup d'état to overthrow President Franklin D. Roosevelt. Butler also claimed the plotters of the alleged coup intended to use him, at the head of a group of veterans, to place the federal government under arrest. The individuals alleged to be involved in the coup all denied the existence of such a plot and the media ridiculed Butler's allegations, but a final report following an investigation by a special House of Representatives committee confirmed at least some of his testimony.

After retiring from the Marine Corps, Butler became an outspoken critic of American foreign policy and military interventions, which he saw being driven primarily by U.S. business interests. In 1935, Butler wrote the book War Is a Racket, in which he argued that imperialist motivations had been the cause behind several American interventions, many of which he personally participated in, the "Banana Wars" in particular. Butler became an anti-war advocate, speaking at meetings organized by veterans, pacifists, and church groups until his death in 1940.

== Early life ==
Smedley Darlington Butler was born on July 30, 1881, in West Chester, Pennsylvania, the eldest of three sons. His parents, Maud (née Darlington) and Thomas Butler, were descendants of local Quaker families. Both parents were of entirely English ancestry, and their families had been in North America since the 17th century.

Smedley's father, Thomas, was a lawyer, a judge, and later served in the U.S. House of Representatives for 31 years, serving as chairman of the House Naval Affairs Committee during the Harding and Coolidge administrations.

Smedley's Marine Corps career successes occurred while his father held that politically influential Congressional seat, controlling the Marine Corps manpower and budget. His maternal grandfather was Smedley Darlington, a Republican congressman from 1887 to 1891. His paternal grandfather was Samuel Butler, who served in the Pennsylvania House of Representatives and served as Pennsylvania State Treasurer from 1880 to 1882. Butler's childhood home is a registered landmark.

Butler attended West Chester Friends Graded High School, followed by the Haverford School, a (then) Quaker-affiliated secondary school, popular with sons of upper-class Philadelphia families. He became captain of the school baseball team and quarterback of its football team. Against the wishes of his father, he left school 38 days before his seventeenth birthday to enlist in the Marine Corps during the Spanish–American War. Haverford awarded him his high school diploma, nevertheless, on June 6, 1898, before the end of his final year. His transcript stated that he completed the scientific course "with Credit".

== Military career ==
=== Spanish–American War ===
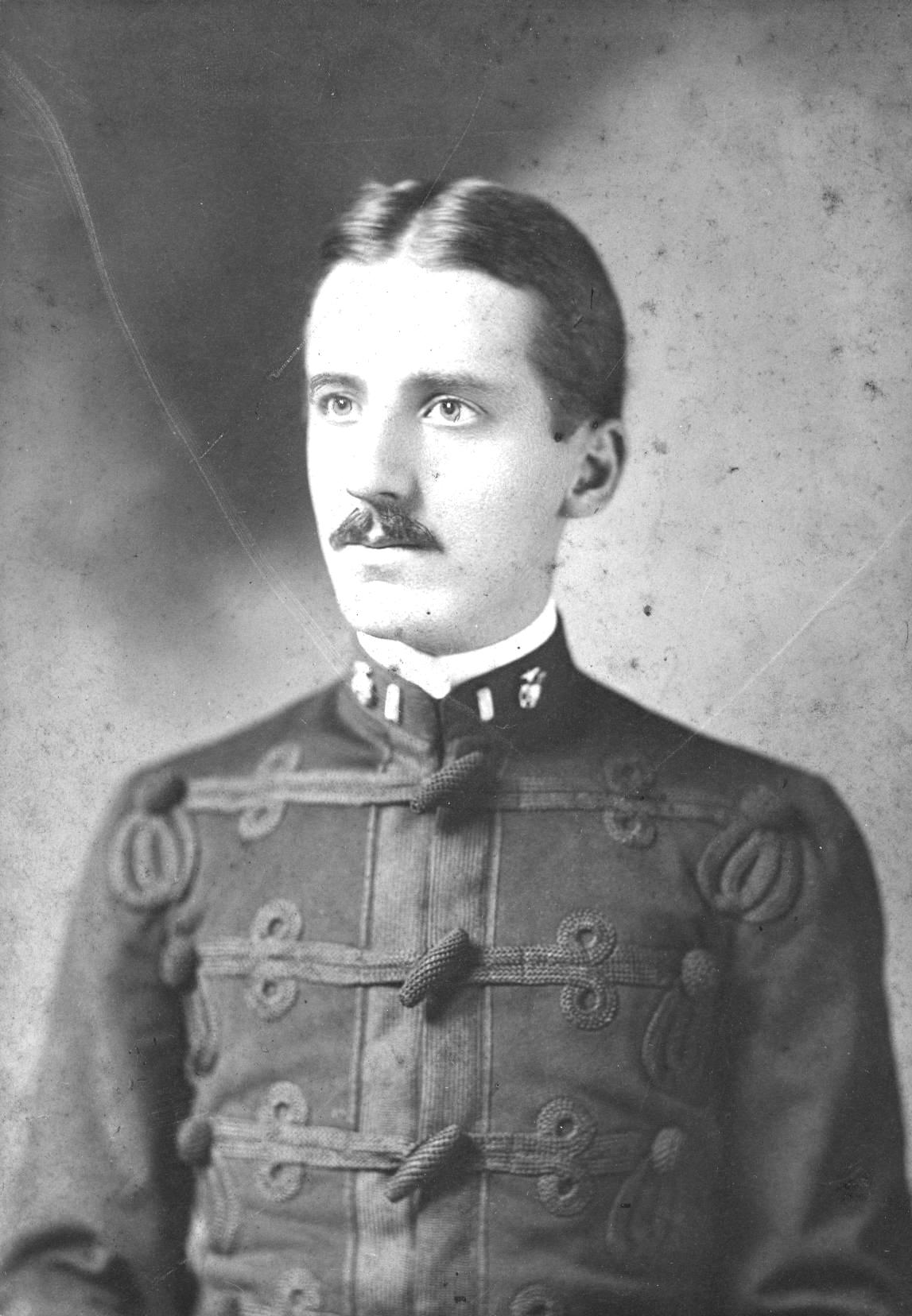
Second Lieutenant Smedley Butler in uniform c. 1898

In the Spanish war fervor of 1898, Butler lied about his age to receive an immediate and direct commission as a Marine second lieutenant. He trained at Marine Barracks, Washington, D.C. In July 1898, he went to Guantánamo Bay, Cuba, arriving shortly after its invasion and capture. His company soon returned to the U.S., and after a short break, he was assigned to the armored cruiser USS New York for four months. He came home to be mustered out of service in February 1899, but on April 8, 1899, he accepted a commission as a first lieutenant in the Marine Corps.

=== Philippine–American War ===
The Marine Corps sent him to Manila, Philippines. On garrison duty with little to do, Butler turned to alcohol to relieve the boredom. He once became drunk and was temporarily relieved of command after an unspecified incident in his room.

In October 1899, he saw his first combat action when he led 300 Marines to take the town of Noveleta from Filipino troops of the new Philippine republic. In the initial moments of the assault, his first sergeant was wounded. Butler briefly panicked, but he quickly regained his composure and led his Marines in pursuit of the fleeing enemy. By noon, the Marines had dispersed the defenders and taken the town. One Marine had been killed, 10 were wounded, and another 50 had been incapacitated by the humid tropical heat.

After the excitement of this combat, garrison duty again became routine. He met Littleton Waller, a fellow Marine with whom he maintained a lifelong friendship. When Waller received command of a company in Guam, he was allowed to select five officers to take with him. Butler was amongst his choices. Before they had departed, their orders were changed, and they were sent to China aboard the USS Solace to help put down the Boxer Rebellion.

=== Boxer Rebellion ===
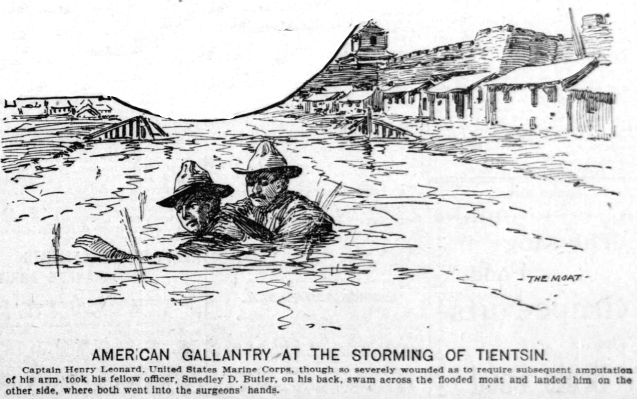
Illustration published in The San Francisco Call on July 22, 1900, depicting Butler being carried on the back of another Marine to safety across a river at the Battle of Tientsin

Once in China, Butler was initially deployed in Tianjin (then often romanized as Tientsin). He took part in the Battle of Tientsin on July 13, 1900, and in the subsequent Gaselee Expedition, during which he saw the mutilated remains of Japanese soldiers. When he saw another Marine officer fall wounded, he climbed out of a trench to rescue him. Butler was then shot in the thigh. Another Marine helped him get to safety, but he was also shot. Despite his leg wound, Butler assisted the wounded officer to the rear. Four enlisted men would receive the Medal of Honor in the battle. Butler's commanding officer, Major Waller, personally commended him and wrote that "for such reward as you may deem proper the following officers: Lieutenant Smedley D. Butler, for the admirable control of his men in all the fights of the week, for saving a wounded man at the risk of his own life, and under a very severe fire." Commissioned officers were not then eligible to receive the Medal of Honor, and Butler instead received a promotion to captain by brevet while he recovered in the hospital, two weeks before his 19th birthday.

He was eligible for the Marine Corps Brevet Medal when it was created in 1921, and was one of only 20 Marines to receive it. His citation reads:

The Secretary of the Navy takes pleasure in transmitting to First Lieutenant Smedley Darlington Butler, United States Marine Corps, the Brevet Medal which is awarded in accordance with Marine Corps Order No. 26 (1921), for distinguished conduct and public service in the presence of the enemy while serving with the Second Battalion of Marines, near Tientsin, China, on 13 July 1900. On 28 March 1901, First Lieutenant Butler is appointed Captain by brevet, to take rank from 13 July 1900.

=== Banana Wars ===
Butler participated in a series of occupations, "police actions", and interventions by the United States in Central America and the Caribbean, later called the Banana Wars due to their goal of protecting American commercial interests in the region, particularly those of the United Fruit Company. This company had significant financial stakes in the production of bananas, tobacco, sugar cane, and other products throughout the Caribbean, Central America, and the northern portions of South America. The U.S. was also trying to advance its own political interests by maintaining its influence in the region and especially its control of the Panama Canal. These interventions started with the Spanish–American War in 1898 and ended with the withdrawal of troops from Haiti and President Franklin D. Roosevelt's Good Neighbor policy in 1934. After his retirement, Butler became an outspoken critic of the United States' business interests in the Caribbean, criticizing the ways in which American businesses and Wall Street bankers imposed their agenda on U.S. foreign policy.

==== Honduras ====
In 1903, Butler was stationed in Puerto Rico on Culebra Island. Hearing rumors of a Honduran revolt, the United States government ordered his unit and a supporting naval detachment to sail to Honduras, 1,500 miles (2,414 km) to the west, to defend the U.S. Consulate there. Using a converted banana boat renamed the Panther, Butler and several hundred Marines landed at the port town of Puerto Cortés. In a letter home, he describes the action: they were "prepared to land and shoot everybody and everything that was breaking the peace", but instead found a quiet town. The Marines re-boarded the Panther and continued up the coastline, looking for rebels at several towns, but found none.

When they arrived at Trujillo, however, they heard gunfire and came upon a battle in progress that had been ongoing for 55 hours between rebels called Bonillista and Honduran government soldiers at a local fort. At the sight of the Marines, the fighting ceased, and Butler led a detachment of Marines to the American consulate, where he found the consul, wrapped in an American flag, hiding among the floor beams. As soon as the Marines left the area with the shaken consul, the battle resumed, and the Bonillistas soon controlled the government. During this expedition, Butler earned the first of his nicknames: "Old Gimlet Eye". It was attributed to his feverish, bloodshot eyes (he was suffering from some unnamed tropical fever at the time) that enhanced his penetrating and bellicose stare.

==== Marriage and business ====
After the Honduran campaign, Butler returned to Philadelphia. He married Ethel Conway Peters of Philadelphia, a daughter of civil engineer and railroad executive Richard Peters, on June 30, 1905. His best man at the wedding was his former commanding officer in China, Lieutenant Colonel Littleton Waller. The couple eventually had three children, a daughter, Ethel Peters Butler, and two sons, Smedley Darlington Jr. and Thomas Richard.

Butler was next assigned to garrison duty in the Philippines, where he once launched a resupply mission across the stormy waters of Subic Bay after his isolated outpost ran out of rations. In 1908, he was diagnosed as having a nervous breakdown and received nine months sick leave, which he spent at home. He successfully managed a coal mine in West Virginia, but returned to active duty in the Marine Corps at the first opportunity.

==== Central America ====
From 1909 to 1912, Butler served in Nicaragua, enforcing U.S. policy. With a 104-degree fever, he led his battalion to the relief of the rebel-besieged city of Granada. In December 1909, he commanded the 3rd Battalion, 1st Marine Regiment on the Isthmus of Panama. On August 11, 1912, he was temporarily detached to command an expeditionary battalion he led in the Battle of Masaya on September 19, 1912, and the bombardment, assault, and capture of Coyotepe Hill, Nicaragua, in October 1912. He remained in Nicaragua until November 1912, when he rejoined the 3rd Battalion, 1st Marines at Camp Elliott, Panama. In private Butler was highly critical of the operation, writing to his parents:

What makes me mad is that the whole revolution is inspired and financed by Americans who have wild cat investments down here and want to make them good by putting in a Government which will declare a monopoly in their favor . . . The whole business is rotten to the core.

==== Veracruz and first Medal of Honor ====
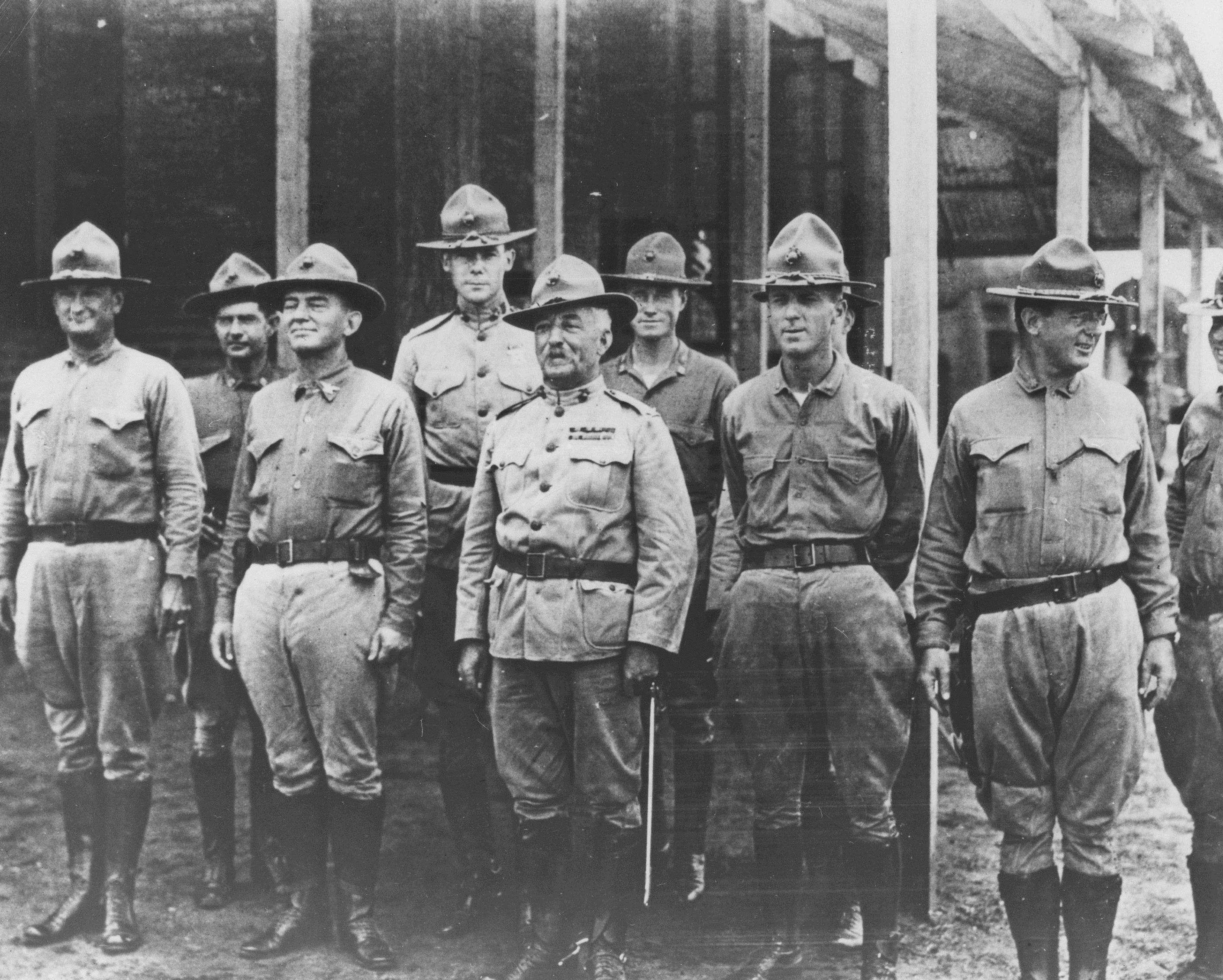
Marine Officers at Veracruz, 1914. Front row, left to right: Wendell C. Neville; John A. Lejeune; Littleton W. T. Waller, Commanding; Smedley Butler.

Butler and his family were living in Panama in January 1914, when he was ordered to report as the Marine officer of a battleship squadron massing off the coast of Mexico, near Veracruz, to monitor a revolutionary movement. He did not like leaving his family and the home they had established in Panama, so he intended to request orders home as soon as he determined he was not needed.

On March 1, 1914, Butler and Navy Lieutenant Frank J. Fletcher (not to be confused with his uncle, Rear Admiral Frank F. Fletcher) "went ashore at Veracruz, where they met the American superintendent of the Inter-Oceanic Railway and surreptitiously rode in his private [railway] car up the line 75 miles to Jalapa and back". One reason for the trip was to allow Butler and Fletcher to discuss the details of a future expedition into Mexico. Fletcher's plan required Butler to make his way into the country and develop a more detailed invasion plan while inside its borders. It was a spy mission, and Butler was enthusiastic to get started. When Fletcher explained the plan to the commanders in Washington, DC, they agreed to it. Butler was given the go-ahead. A few days later, he set out by train on his spy mission to Mexico City, with a stopover at Puebla. He made his way to the U.S. Consulate in Mexico City, posing as a railroad official named "Mr. Johnson".

- March 5. As I was reading last night, waiting for dinner to be served, a visitant, rather than a visitor, appeared in my drawing-room incognito – a simple "Mr. Johnson," eager, intrepid, dynamic, efficient, unshaven! * * *

He and the chief railroad inspector scoured the city, saying that they were searching for a lost railroad employee; there was no lost employee, and in fact, the employee who they said was lost never existed. The ruse gave Butler access to various areas of the city. In the process of the so-called search, they located weapons in use by the Mexican army and determined the size of units and states of readiness. They updated maps and verified the railroad lines for use in an impending U.S. invasion. On March 7, 1914, he returned to Veracruz with the information he had gathered and presented it to his commanders. The invasion plan was eventually scrapped, when authorities loyal to Mexican General Victoriano Huerta detained a small American naval landing party (that had gone ashore to buy gasoline) in Tampico, Mexico, which led to what became known as the Tampico Affair.

When President Woodrow Wilson discovered that an arms shipment was about to arrive in Mexico, he sent a contingent of Marines and sailors to Veracruz to intercept it on April 21, 1914. Over the next few days, street fighting and sniper fire posed a threat to Butler's force, but a door-to-door search rooted out most of the resistance. By April 26, the landing force of 5,800 Marines and sailors secured the city, which they held for the next six months. By the end of the conflict, the Americans reported 17 dead and 63 wounded; the Mexican forces had 126 dead and 195 wounded. After the actions at Veracruz, the U.S. decided to minimize the bloodshed and changed their plans from a full invasion of Mexico to simply maintaining the city of Veracruz. For his actions on April 22, Butler was awarded his first Medal of Honor. The citation reads:

For distinguished conduct in battle, engagement of Vera Cruz, 22 April 1914. Major Butler was eminent and conspicuous in command of his battalion. He exhibited courage and skill in leading his men through the action of the 22d and in the final occupation of the city.

After the occupation of Veracruz, an unusually high number of U.S. military personnel received the Medal of Honor. The Army presented one, nine went to Marines, and 46 were bestowed upon naval personnel. During World War I, Butler attempted to return his medal, explaining he had done nothing to deserve it. The medal was returned to him with orders to keep it and to wear it, as well.

==== Haiti and second Medal of Honor ====
In 1915, Haitian President Vilbrun Guillaume Sam was killed by a mob. In response, the United States ordered the USS Connecticut to Haiti, with Major Butler and a group of Marines on board. On October 24, 1915, an estimated 400 Cacos (Haitian rebels) ambushed Butler's patrol of 44 mounted Marines when they approached Fort Dipitie. Surrounded by Cacos, the Marines maintained their perimeter throughout the night. The next morning, they charged the much-larger enemy force by breaking out in three directions. The startled Haitians fled. In early November, Butler and a force of 700 Marines and sailors returned to the mountains to clear the area. At their temporary headquarters base at Le Trou, they fought off an attack by about 100 Cacos. After the Americans took several other forts and ramparts during the following days, only Fort Rivière, an old, French-built stronghold atop Montagne Noire, was left.

For the operation, Butler was given three companies of Marines and some sailors from the USS Connecticut, about 100 men. They encircled the fort and gradually closed in on it. Butler reached the fort from the southern side with the 15th Company and found a small opening in the wall. The Marines entered through the opening and engaged the Cacos in hand-to-hand combat. Butler and the Marines took the rebel stronghold on November 17, 1915, an action for which he received his second Medal of Honor, as well as the Haitian Medal of Honor. The entire battle lasted less than 20 minutes. Reportedly, only one Marine was injured in the assault; he was struck by a rock and lost two teeth. About 50 Haitians in the fort were killed. Butler's exploits impressed Assistant Secretary of the Navy Franklin D. Roosevelt, who recommended the award, based on Butler's performance during the engagement. Once the medal was approved and presented in 1917, Butler became one of only two Marines to receive the Medal of Honor twice for separate actions, a distinction shared with Dan Daly. Butler's citation reads:

For extraordinary heroism in action as Commanding Officer of detachments from the 5th, 13th, 23d Companies and the Marine and sailor detachment from the U.S.S. Connecticut, Major Butler led the attack on Fort Rivière, Haiti, 17 November 1915. Following a concentrated drive, several different detachments of Marines gradually closed in on the old French bastion fort in an effort to cut off all avenues of retreat for the Cacos. Reaching the fort on the southern side where there was a small opening in the wall, Major Butler gave the signal to attack and Marines from the 15th Company poured through the breach, engaged the Cacos, took the bastion, and crushed the Cacos resistance.

Subsequently, as the initial organizer and commanding officer of the Gendarmerie d'Haïti (the native police force), Butler established a record as a capable administrator. Under his supervision, social order, administered by the Haitian government of Philippe Sudré Dartiguenave, was largely restored. Major Butler received a commission from Dartiguenave as a général de division while he was serving as the gendarmerie commandant. He recalled later that during his time in Haiti, he and his troops "hunted the Cacos like pigs."

=== World War I ===
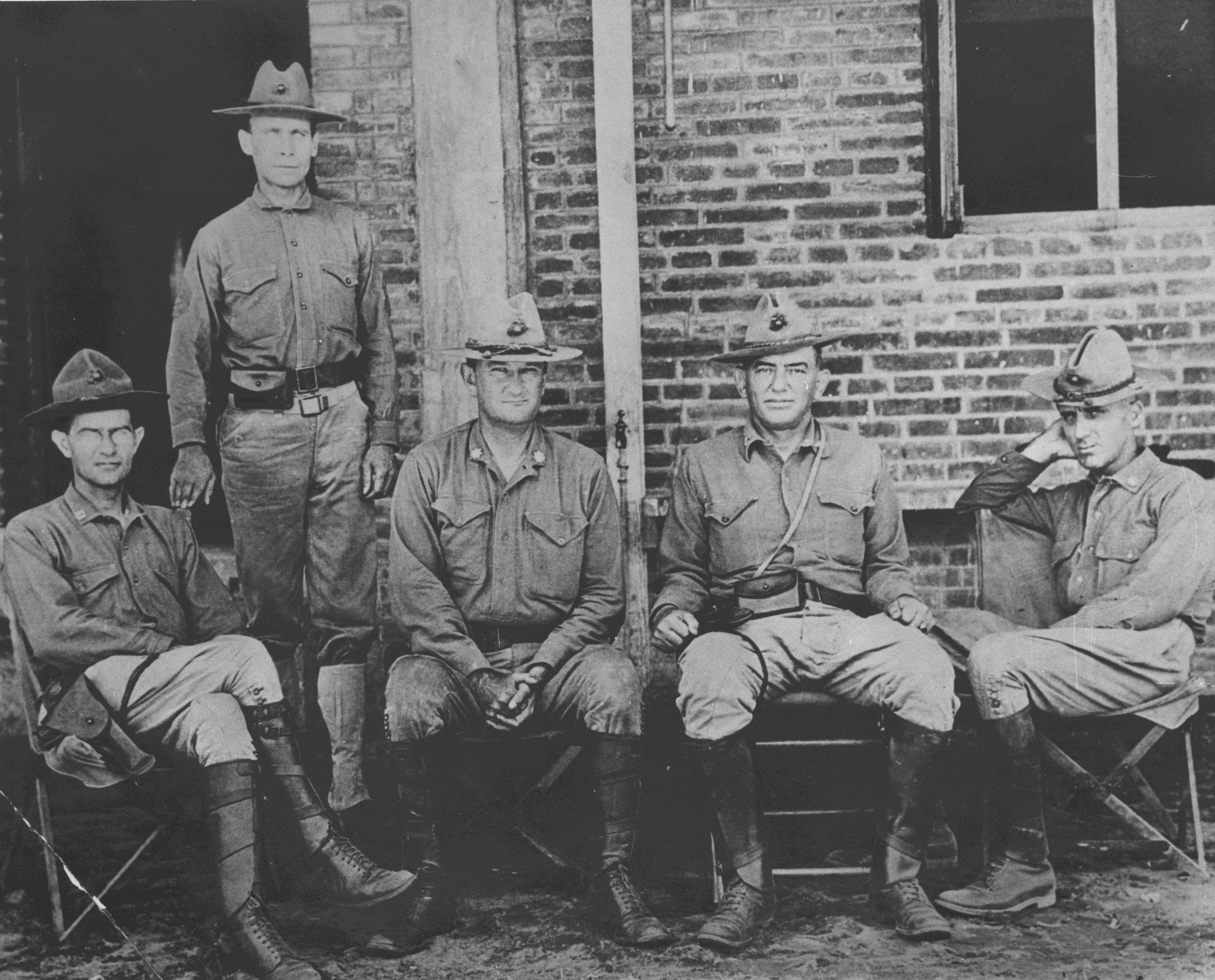
Butler (far right) with other Marines in Vera Cruz, Mexico, 1914. From left to right: Sgt. Maj. John H. Quick, Maj. Gen. Wendell Cushing Neville, Col. John Archer Lejeune.

During World War I, Butler was (to his disappointment) not assigned to a combat command on the Western Front. He made several requests for a posting in France, writing letters to his personal friend and fellow Medal of Honor recipient, Wendell Cushing Neville, who was in command of the 5th Marines in Europe. While Butler's superiors considered him brave and brilliant, they described him as "unreliable."

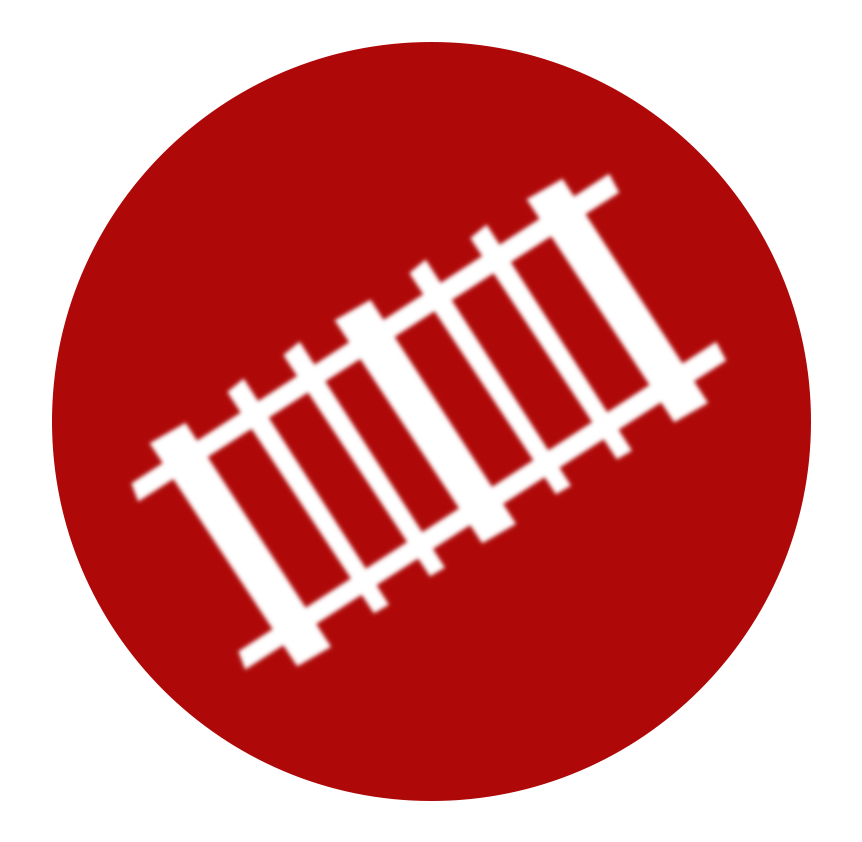
Camp Pontanezen patch

In October 1918, at the age of 37, he was promoted to the rank of brigadier general and placed in command of Camp Pontanezen at Brest, France, a debarkation depot that funneled troops of the American Expeditionary Force to the battlefields. The camp had been unsanitary, overcrowded, and disorganized. U.S. Secretary of War Newton Baker sent novelist Mary Roberts Rinehart to report on the camp. She later described how Butler tackled the sanitation problems. He began by solving the problem of mud. "[T]he ground under the tents was nothing but mud, [so] he had raided the wharf at Brest of the duckboards no longer needed for the trenches, carted the first one himself up that four-mile hill to the camp, and thus provided something in the way of protection for the men to sleep on." Gen. John J. Pershing authorized a duckboard shoulder patch for the units. This earned Butler another nickname: "Old Duckboard." For his exemplary service, he was awarded both the Army Distinguished Service Medal and the Navy Distinguished Service Medal, as well as the French Order of the Black Star.

The citation for the Army Distinguished Service Medal states:

The President of the United States of America, authorized by Act of Congress, July 9, 1918, takes pleasure in presenting the Army Distinguished Service Medal to Brigadier General Smedley Darlington Butler, United States Marine Corps, for exceptionally meritorious and distinguished services to the Government of the United States, in a duty of great responsibility during World War I. Brigadier General Butler commanded with ability and energy Pontanezen Camp at Brest during the time in which it has developed into the largest embarkation camp in the world. Confronted with problems of extraordinary magnitude in supervising the reception, entertainment and departure of the large numbers of officers and soldiers passing through this camp, he has solved all with conspicuous success, performing services of the highest character for the American Expeditionary Forces.

=== Quantico ===
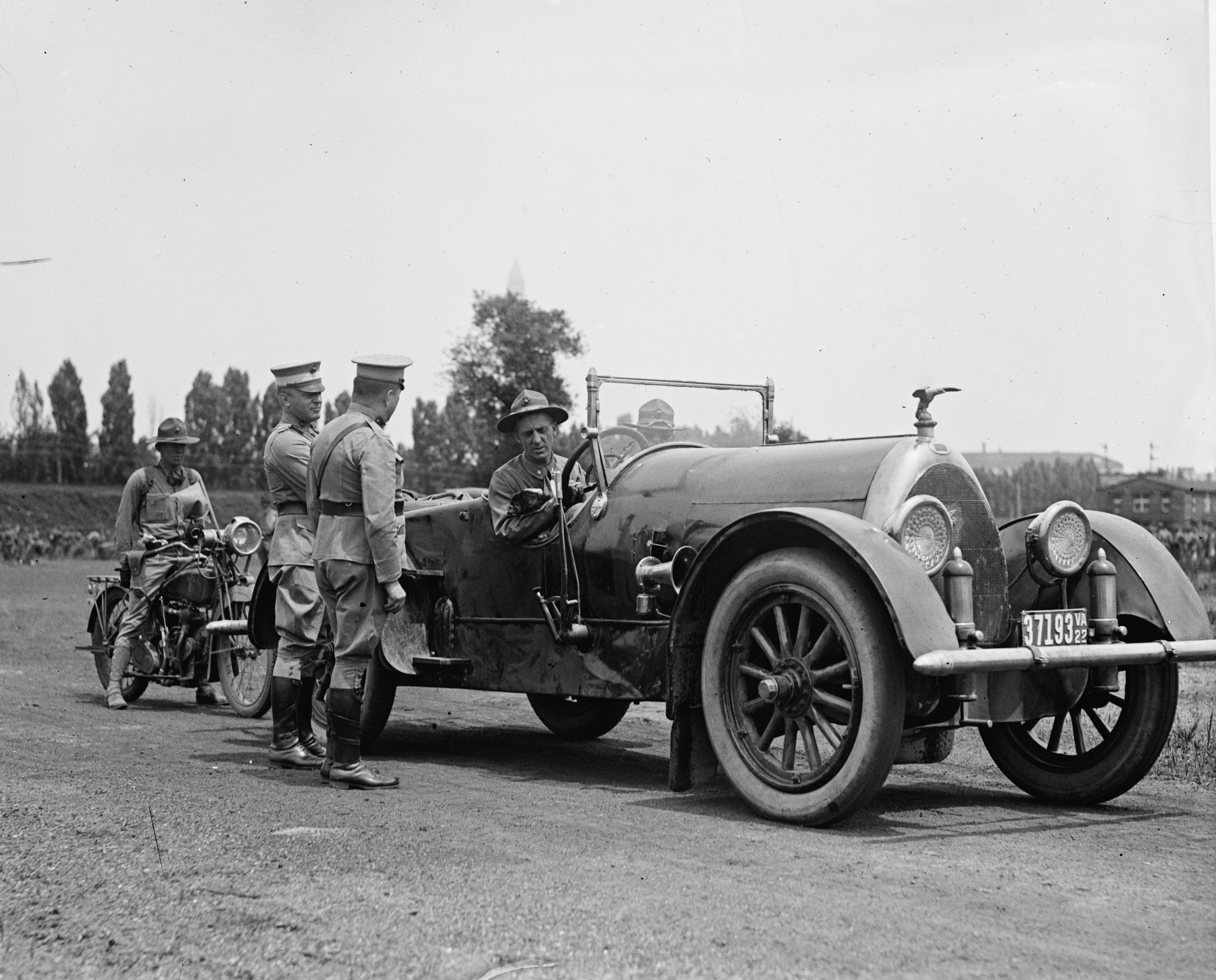
Butler sitting in car at Gettysburg during a Pickett's Charge reenactment by Marines in 1922

Following the war, in 1919, he became commanding general of the Marine barracks at Marine Corps Base Quantico, Virginia. At Quantico, he transformed the wartime training camp into a permanent Marine post. He directed the Quantico camp's growth until it became the "showplace" of the Corps. Butler won national attention by taking thousands of his men on long field marches (many of which he led from the front) to Gettysburg and other Civil War battle sites, where they conducted large-scale re-enactments before crowds of distinguished spectators.

In 1921, during a training exercise near the Wilderness battlefield in Virginia, he was told by a local farmer that Stonewall Jackson's arm was buried nearby, to which he replied, "Bosh! I will take a squad of Marines and dig up that spot to prove you wrong!" Butler found the arm in a box. He later replaced the wooden box with a metal one and reburied the arm. He left a plaque on the granite monument marking the burial place of Jackson's arm; the plaque is no longer on the marker, but it can be viewed at the Chancellorsville Battlefield visitor center.

=== Philadelphia Director of Public Safety ===
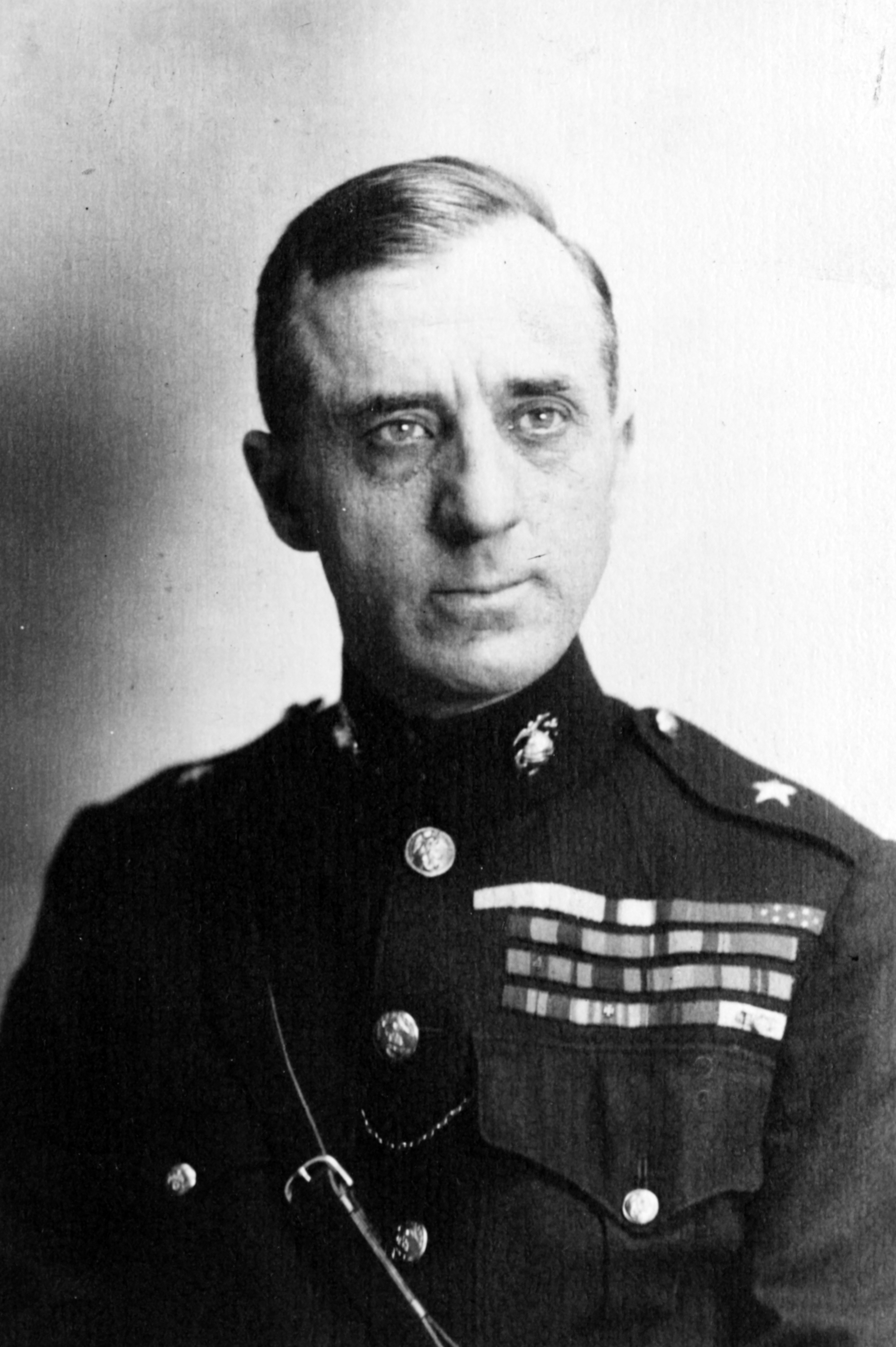
Brigadier General Smedley Butler in uniform c. 1921–1929

In January 1924, newly elected Mayor of Philadelphia W. Freeland Kendrick asked President Calvin Coolidge to lend the city a military general to help him rid Philadelphia's municipal government of crime and corruption. At the urging of Butler's father, Coolidge authorized Butler to take the necessary leave from the Corps to serve as Philadelphia's director of public safety, in charge of running the city's police and fire departments. (Butler held this position from January 1924 until December 1925). He began his new job by assembling all 4,000 of the city police into the Metropolitan Opera House in shifts to introduce himself and inform them that things would change while he was in charge. Since he had not been given authority to fire corrupt police officers, he switched entire units from one part of the city to another, in order to undermine local protection rackets and profiteering.

Within 48 hours of taking over, Butler organized raids on more than 900 speakeasies, ordering that they be padlocked and destroyed in many cases. In addition to raiding the speakeasies, he also attempted to eliminate other illegal activities, including bootlegging, prostitution, gambling, and police corruption. More zealous than he was political, he ordered crackdowns on the social elite's favorite hangouts, such as the Ritz-Carlton and the Union League, as well as on drinking establishments that served the working class. Although he was effective in reducing crime and police corruption, he was a controversial leader. In one instance, he made a statement that he would promote the first officer to kill a bandit and stated, "I don't believe there is a single bandit notch on a policeman's guns [sic] in this city; go out and get some." Although many of the local citizens and police felt that the raids were just a show, they continued for several weeks.

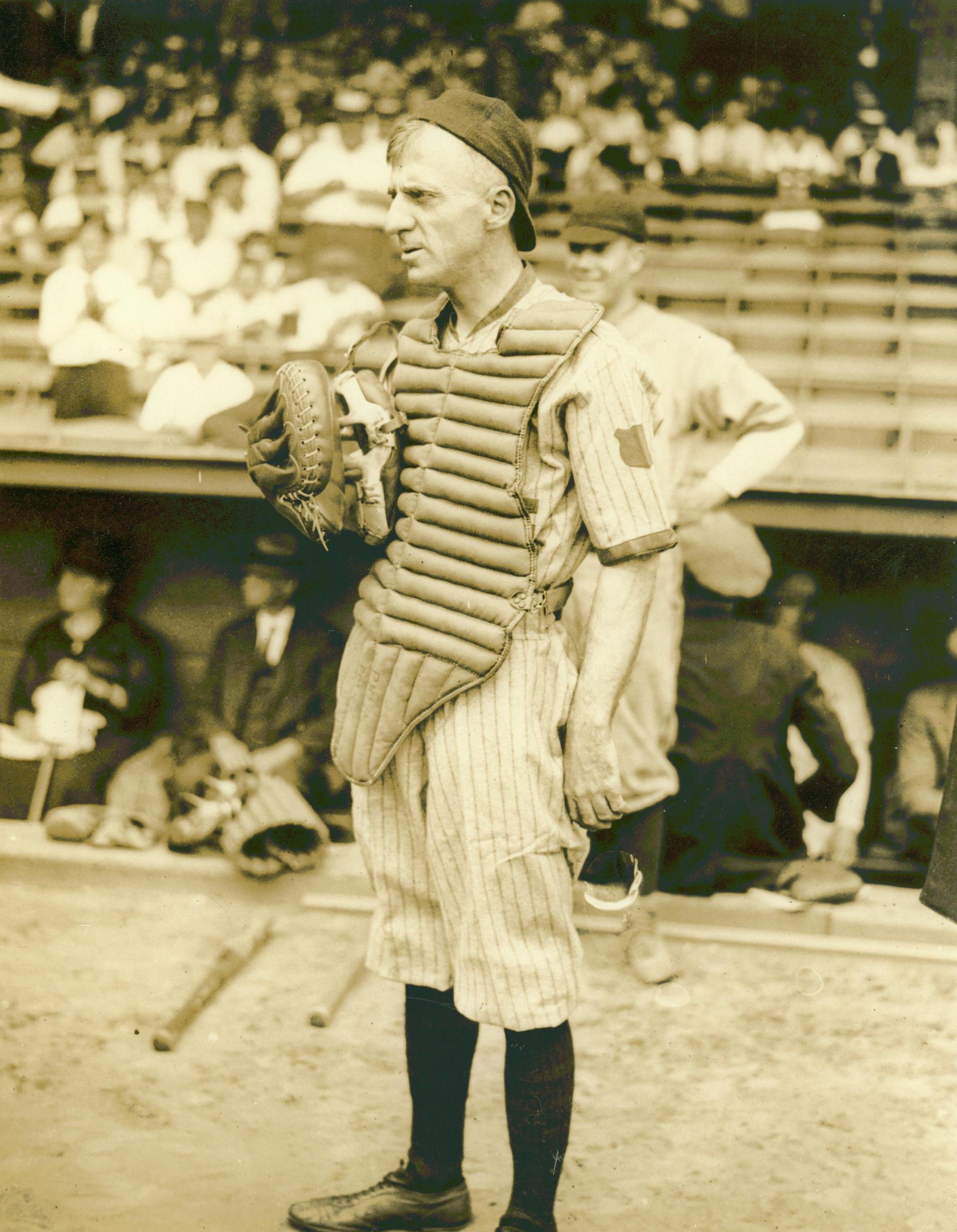
Butler on the Philadelphia Police Baseball Team c. 1925.

Among his many accomplishments as the director of public safety, he implemented programs to improve city safety and security, established policies and guidelines for the administration, and developed a Philadelphia police uniform that resembled that of the Marine Corps. Other changes included military-style checkpoints into the city and bandit-chasing squads, who were armed with sawed-off shotguns and armored police cars. The press began reporting on both the good and the bad aspects of Butler's personal war on crime. They praised the new uniforms, the new programs, and the reductions in crime, but they also reflected the public's negative opinion of their new public safety director. Many felt that he was being too aggressive in his tactics and resented the reductions in their civil rights, such as the stopping of citizens at the city checkpoints. Butler frequently swore in his radio addresses, causing many citizens to suggest that his behavior, and particularly his language, was inappropriate for someone of his rank and stature. Some even suggested that Butler was acting like a military dictator, even charging that he wrongfully used active-duty Marines in some of his raids. Maj. R.A. Haynes, the federal prohibition commissioner, visited the city in 1924, six months after Butler was appointed. He announced that "great progress" had been made in the city, and he attributed that success to Butler.

Eventually, Butler's leadership style and the directness of actions undermined his support within the community, so his departure seemed imminent. Mayor Kendrick reported to the press, "I had the guts to bring General Butler to Philadelphia and I have the guts to fire him." Feeling that his duties in Philadelphia were coming to an end, Butler contacted Gen. Lejeune to prepare for his return to the Marine Corps. Not all of the citizens felt that Butler was doing a bad job, though, and when the news started to leak that he would be leaving, people began to gather at the Academy of Music. A group of 4,000 supporters assembled and negotiated a truce between him and the mayor to keep him in Philadelphia for a while longer, and the president authorized a one-year extension.

Butler devoted much of his second year to executing arrest warrants, cracking down on crooked police, and enforcing prohibition. On January 1, 1926, his leave from the Marine Corps ended, and the president declined a request for a second extension. Butler received orders to report to San Diego and prepared his family and his belongings for the new assignment. In light of his pending departure, he began to defy the mayor and other key city officials. On the eve of his departure, he had an article printed in the paper that stated his intention to stay and "finish the job". The mayor was surprised and furious when he read the press release the next morning and demanded Butler's resignation. After almost two years in office, Butler resigned under pressure, stating later that "cleaning up Philadelphia was worse than any battle I was ever in."

=== San Diego duty ===
Following the period of service as the director of public safety in Philadelphia, Butler assumed command on February 28, 1926, of the U.S. Marine Corps base in San Diego, California, in ceremonies involving officers and the band of the 4th Marine Regiment. He oversaw base construction efforts and established it as the expeditionary force base for the Far East.

=== China and stateside service ===
From 1927 to 1929, Butler was commander of a Marine Expeditionary Force in Tianjin, China, (the China Marines). While there, he cleverly parlayed his influence among various generals and warlords to the protection of U.S. interests, ultimately winning the public acclaim of contending Chinese leaders. When he returned to the United States in 1929 he was promoted to major general, becoming, at age 48, the youngest major general of the Marine Corps. But, the death of his father on May 26, 1928, ended the Pennsylvania Congressman's ability to protect Smedley from political retribution for his outspoken views.

In 1931, Butler violated diplomatic norms by publicly recounting gossip about Benito Mussolini in which the dictator allegedly struck and killed a child with his speeding automobile in a hit-and-run accident. The Italian government protested and President Hoover, who strongly disliked Butler, forced Secretary of the Navy Charles Francis Adams III to court-martial him. Butler became the first general officer to be placed under arrest since the Civil War. He apologized to Secretary Adams and the court-martial was canceled with only a reprimand.

== Military retirement ==
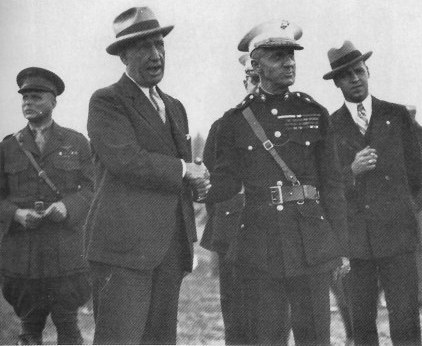
Maj. Gen. Butler at his retirement ceremony, 1931

When Commandant of the Marine Corps Maj. Gen. Wendell C. Neville died July 8, 1930, Butler, at that time the senior major general in the Corps, was a candidate for the position. Although he had significant support from many inside and outside the Corps, including John Lejeune and Josephus Daniels, two other Marine Corps generals were seriously considered, Ben H. Fuller and John H. Russell Jr. Lejeune and others petitioned President Herbert Hoover, garnered support in the Senate and flooded Secretary of the Navy Charles Adams' desk with more than 2,500 letters of support. With the recent death of his influential father, however, Butler had lost much of his protection from his civilian superiors. The outspokenness that characterized his run-ins with the mayor of Philadelphia, the "unreliability" mentioned by his superiors when they were opposing Butler's World War I posting to the Western Front, and his comments about Benito Mussolini resurfaced. In the end, the position of commandant went to Fuller, who had more years of commissioned service than Butler and was considered less controversial. Butler requested retirement and left active duty on October 1, 1931.

== Later years ==
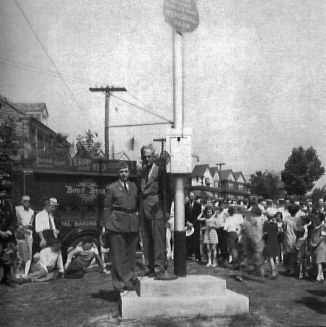
Smedley Butler at one of his many speaking engagements after his retirement in the 1930s

Even before retiring from the Marine Corps, Butler began developing his post-Corps career. In May 1931, he took part in a commission established by Oregon Governor Julius L. Meier, which laid the foundations for the Oregon State Police. He also began lecturing at events and conferences. After he retired from the Marines in 1931, he took to the lecture circuit full time, and donated much of his earnings from his lucrative lectures to Philadelphia unemployment relief. He toured the western United States, making 60 speeches before returning for his daughter's marriage to Marine aviator Lt. John Wehle. Her wedding was the only time he wore his dress blue uniform after he left the Marines.

=== Senate campaign ===
In March 1932, Butler announced his candidacy for the upcoming U.S. Senate election in Pennsylvania. He ran in the Republican primary in Pennsylvania as a proponent of Prohibition. Butler allied with Pennsylvania governor Gifford Pinchot, but was defeated in the April 26, 1932, primary election with only 37.5% of the vote to incumbent Sen. James J. Davis's 60%. Butler voted for Norman Thomas of the Socialist Party for president in 1936.

=== Bonus Army ===
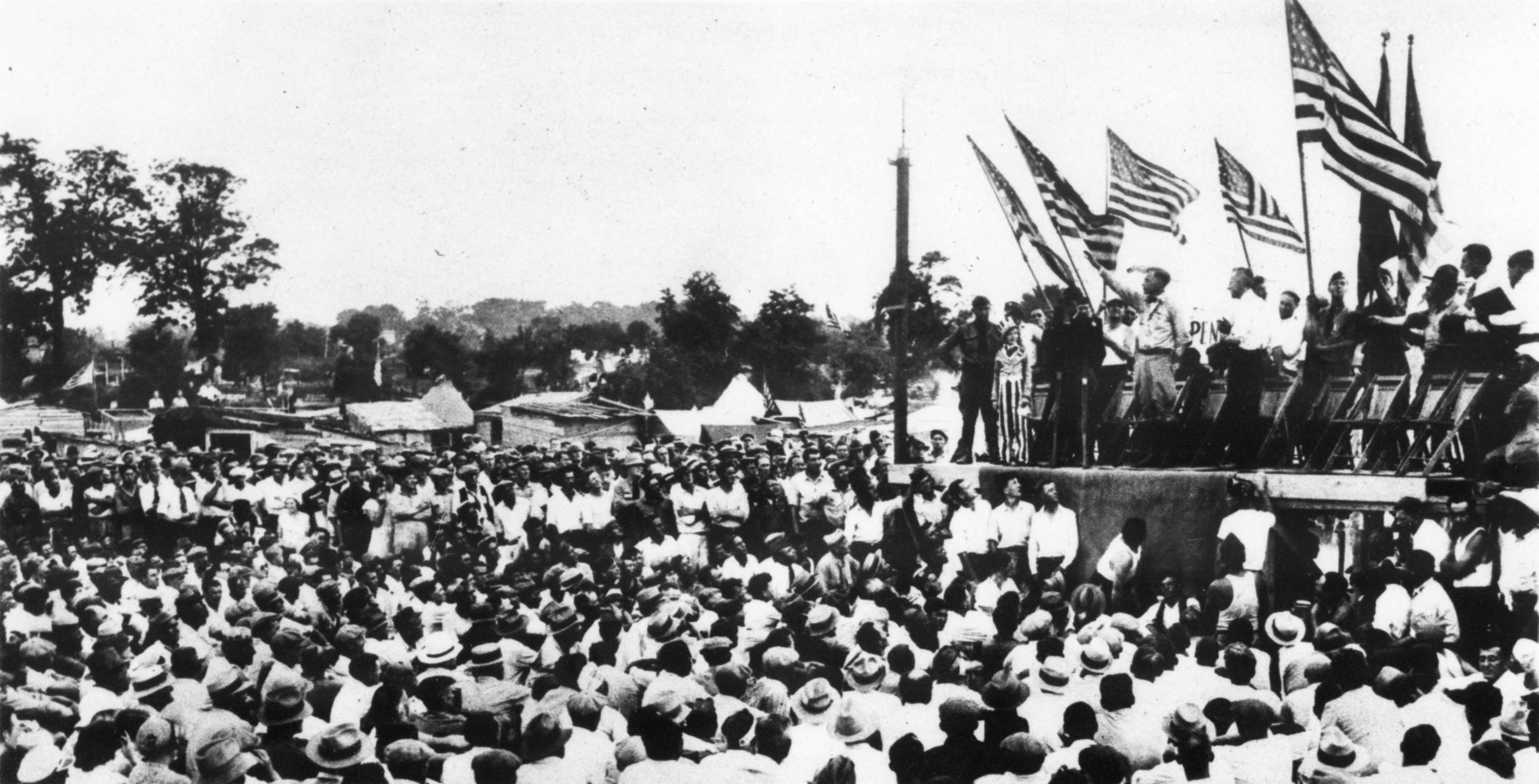
Butler (on stage, right) addresses the Bonus Army encampment in Washington, D.C. alongside Commander Walter W. Waters (left), July 1932

During his Senate campaign, Butler spoke out forcefully about the veterans' bonus. Veterans of World War I, many of whom had been out of work since the beginning of the Great Depression, sought immediate cash payment of Service Certificates granted to them eight years earlier via the World War Adjusted Compensation Act of 1924. Each Service Certificate, issued to a qualified veteran soldier, bore a face value equal to the soldier's promised payment, plus compound interest. The problem was that the certificates, like bonds, matured 20 years from the date of original issuance; thus, under extant law, the Service Certificates could not be redeemed until 1945. In June 1932, approximately 43,000 marchers, including 17,000 World War I veterans, their families, and affiliated groups, protested in Washington, D.C. The Bonus Expeditionary Force, also known as the "Bonus Army", marched on Washington to advocate the passage of the "soldier's bonus" for service during World War I. After Congress adjourned, bonus marchers remained in the city and became unruly. On July 28, 1932, two bonus marchers were shot by police, causing the entire mob to become hostile and riotous. The FBI, then known as the United States Bureau of Investigation, checked its fingerprint records to obtain the police records of individuals who had been arrested during the riots or who had participated in the bonus march.

The veterans made camp in the Anacostia flats while they awaited the congressional decision on whether or not to pay the bonus. The motion, known as the Patman bill, was decisively defeated, but the veterans stayed in their camp. On July 19, Butler arrived with his young son Thomas, the day before the official eviction by the Hoover administration. He walked through the camp and spoke to the veterans; he told them that they were fine soldiers and they had a right to lobby Congress just as much as any corporation. He and his son spent the night and ate with the men, and in the morning Butler gave a speech to the camping veterans. He instructed them to keep their sense of humor and cautioned them not to do anything that would cost public sympathy. On July 28, army cavalry units led by General Douglas MacArthur dispersed the Bonus Army by riding through it and using tear gas. During the conflict several veterans were killed or injured. Butler declared himself a "Hoover-for-Ex-President-Republican".

=== Anti-war lectures ===
After his retirement and later years, Butler became widely known for his outspoken lectures against war profiteering, U.S. military adventurism, and what he viewed as nascent fascism in the United States.

In December 1933, Butler toured the country with James E. Van Zandt to recruit members for the Veterans of Foreign Wars (VFW). He described their effort as "trying to educate the soldiers out of the sucker class." In his speeches he denounced the Economy Act of 1933, called on veterans to organize politically to win their benefits, and condemned the FDR administration for its ties to big business. The VFW reprinted one of his speeches with the title "You Got to Get Mad" in its magazine Foreign Service. He said: "I believe in...taking Wall St. by the throat and shaking it up." He believed the rival veterans' group the American Legion was controlled by banking interests. On December 8, 1933, he said: "I have never known one leader of the American Legion who had never sold them out—and I mean it."

In addition to his speeches to pacifist groups, he served from 1935 to 1937 as a spokesman for the American League Against War and Fascism. In 1935, he wrote the exposé War Is a Racket, a trenchant condemnation of the profit motive behind warfare. His views on the subject are summarized in the following passage from the November 1935 issue of the socialist magazine Common Sense:

I spent 33 years and four months in active military service and during that period I spent most of my time as a high class muscle man for Big Business, for Wall Street and the bankers. In short, I was a racketeer; a gangster for capitalism. I helped make Mexico and especially Tampico safe for American oil interests in 1914. I helped make Haiti and Cuba a decent place for the National City Bank boys to collect revenues in. I helped in the raping of half a dozen Central American republics for the benefit of Wall Street. I helped purify Nicaragua for the International Banking House of Brown Brothers in 1902–1912. I brought light to the Dominican Republic for the American sugar interests in 1916. I helped make Honduras right for the American fruit companies in 1903. In China in 1927 I helped see to it that Standard Oil went on its way unmolested. Looking back on it, I might have given Al Capone a few hints. The best he could do was to operate his racket in three districts. I operated on three continents.

=== Business Plot ===
Smedley Butler describes a political conspiracy to overthrow U.S. President Franklin D. Roosevelt in 1935.

In November 1934, Butler claimed the existence of a political conspiracy by business leaders to overthrow President Roosevelt, a series of allegations that came to be known in the media as the Business Plot. A special committee of the House of Representatives headed by Representatives John W. McCormack of Massachusetts and Samuel Dickstein of New York, who was later alleged to have been a paid agent of the Soviet Union's NKVD, heard his testimony in secret. The McCormack–Dickstein committee was a precursor to the House Un-American Activities Committee.

Butler told the committee that one Gerald P. MacGuire told him that a group of businessmen, supposedly backed by a private army of 500,000 ex-soldiers and others, intended to establish a fascist dictatorship. Butler had been asked to lead it, he said, by MacGuire, who was a bond salesman with Grayson M. P. Murphy & Co. The New York Times reported that Butler had told friends that General Hugh S. Johnson, former head of the National Recovery Administration, was to be installed as dictator, and that the J.P. Morgan banking firm was behind the plot. Butler told Congress that MacGuire had told him the attempted coup was backed by three million dollars, and that the 500,000 men were probably to be assembled in Washington, D.C. the following year. All the parties alleged to be involved publicly said there was no truth in the story, calling it a joke and a fantasy.

In its report to the House, the committee stated that, while "no evidence was presented... to show a connection... with any fascist activity of any European country... [t]here was no question that these attempts were discussed, were planned, and might have been placed in execution..." and that "your committee was able to verify all the pertinent statements made by General Butler, with the exception of the direct statement about the creation of the organization. This, however, was corroborated in the correspondence of MacGuire with his principal, Robert Sterling Clark...."

No prosecutions or further investigations followed, and historians have questioned whether or not a coup was actually contemplated. Historians have not reported any independent evidence apart from Butler's report on what MacGuire told him. One of these, Hans Schmidt, says MacGuire was an "inconsequential trickster". The news media dismissed the plot, with a New York Times editorial characterizing it as a "gigantic hoax". When the committee's final report was released in 1935, however, the Times said the committee "purported to report that a two-month investigation had convinced it that General Butler's story of a Fascist march on Washington was alarmingly true" and "... also alleged that definite proof had been found that the much publicized Fascist march on Washington, which was to have been led by Major Gen. Smedley D. Butler, retired, according to testimony at a hearing, was actually contemplated". The individuals involved all denied the existence of a plot.

=== Death ===
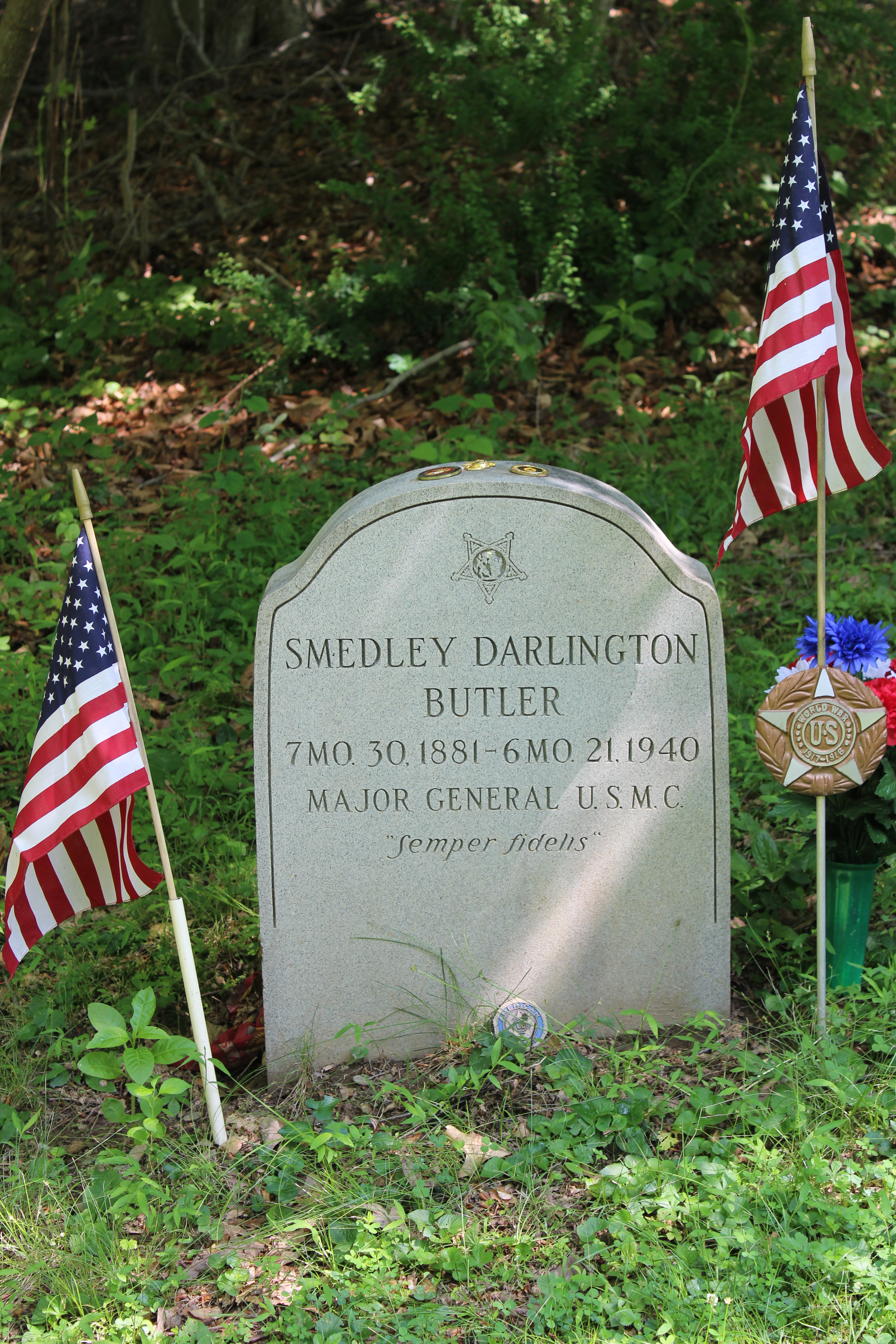
Smedley Butler gravestone in Oaklands Cemetery

After his retirement, Butler bought a home in Newtown Township, Delaware County, Pennsylvania, where he lived with his wife. In June 1940, he checked himself into the hospital after becoming sick a few weeks earlier. His doctor described his illness as an incurable condition of the upper gastro-intestinal tract, which was reported to be cancer. His family remained by his side, even bringing his new car so he could see it from the window. He never had a chance to drive it. On June 21, 1940, Smedley Butler died at Naval Hospital, Philadelphia.

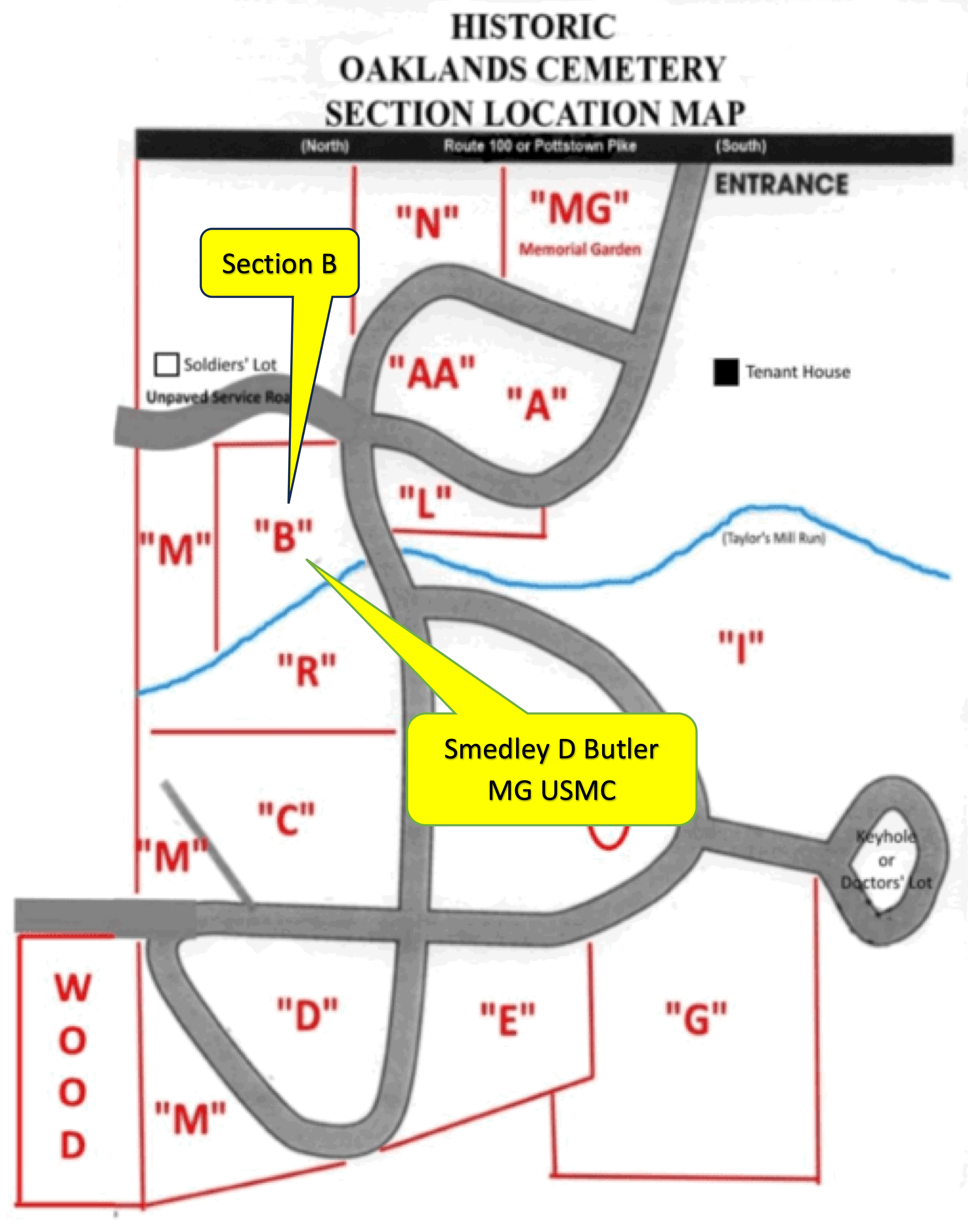
Location of Smedley Butler gravestone in Section B-1

The funeral was held at his home, attended by friends and family as well as several politicians, members of the Philadelphia police force, and officers of the Marine Corps. He was buried at Oaklands Cemetery in West Goshen Township, Pennsylvania. His modest gravestone is located in Section B-1 (see site map). After his death, until 2014, his family maintained his home as it was when he died, including a large quantity of memorabilia he collected throughout his storied career.

== Honors, awards, and promotions ==
=== Military awards ===
Butler's awards and decorations included the following: (Note: The Expeditionary Medal, as was worn for part of his career, would have used award numerals; in Butler's case, a "4" would have been worn to denote 4 deployments. The wearing of numerals was discontinued in 1921 in favor of service stars.)

1st row	Medal of Honor		Medal of Honor; 2nd award	
2nd row	Marine Corps Brevet Medal	Distinguished Service Medal (United States Navy)	Distinguished Service Medal (United States Army)	Marine Corps Expeditionary Medal with three bronze service stars
3rd row	Spanish Campaign Medal	China Relief Expedition Medal	Philippine Campaign Medal	Nicaraguan Campaign Medal
4th row	Haitian Campaign Medal	Dominican Campaign Medal	Mexican Service Medal	World War I Victory Medal with maltese cross
5th row	Yangtze Service Medal	National Order of Honour and Merit; Grand Cross (Haiti)	Haiti Médaille militaire	Commander of the Order of the Black Star (France)

=== Other honors and recognition ===
- USS Butler (DD-636), a Gleaves-class destroyer, was named in his honor in 1942. This vessel participated in the European and Pacific theaters of operations during the Second World War. She was later converted to a high speed minesweeper.
- Marine Corps Base Camp Smedley D. Butler in Okinawa, Japan, established in 1955, is named in his honor
- The Boston, Massachusetts, chapter of Veterans for Peace is called the Smedley D. Butler Brigade in his honor.
- Butler was featured in the 2003 Canadian documentary film The Corporation.
- In his book My First Days in the White House, Senator Huey Long of Louisiana stated that, if elected to the presidency, he would name Butler as his Secretary of War.
- His childhood home at West Chester, The Butler House, was listed on the National Register of Historic Places in 1980.
- A fictionalized version of Butler is portrayed by Robert De Niro as a retired marine named Gilbert Dillenbeck in the 2022 film Amsterdam, the plot of which revolves around Dillenbeck foiling an attempted business plot by fascist conspirators.

=== Promotions and retirement ===
Rank	Promotion Date	Age	Location	Note
Second Lieutenant	June 10, 1898	16	Washington, D.C.	Attachment date.
First Lieutenant	April 8, 1899	17	En route to Cavite, Philippines	
Captain	July 23, 1900 (Note: Strecker lists June 23, but his account mistakenly substitutes June for July in several instances. July 23 fits the dated events of the Battle of Tientsin and its aftermath.)	19	Tianjin, China	Breveted to captain for actions on July 13 before receiving full promotion.
Major	October 1908	27	Philadelphia, Pennsylvania	
Lieutenant Colonel	April 22, 1917	35	Port-au-Prince, Haiti	Retroactive to August 29, 1916.
Colonel	August 2, 1918	37	Marine Corps Base Quantico, Virginia	Awarded upon taking command of new training base.
Brigadier General	November 19, 1918	37	Camp Pontanezen, Brest, France	Retroactive to October 7, 1918. Awarded upon taking command of camp, Butler became the youngest general in Marine Corps history.
Major General	July 13, 1929	47	Marine Corps Base Quantico	
Retirement	October 1, 1931	50	Marine Corps Base Quantico	

== Published works ==
=== Books ===
- Walter Garvin in Mexico (1927, with Arthur J. Burks)
- Paraguay: A Gallant Little Nation: The Story of Paraguay's War with Bolivia (1935, with Philip de Ronde)
- War Is a Racket (1935)

=== Articles ===
- Smashing Crime and Vice (30-part syndicated newspaper series), Bell Syndicate, April–May 1926 [ghostwritten by Eli Zachary Dimitman]
- "American Marines in China", The Annals of the American Academy of Political and Social Science, July 1929, 128–134, OCLC 4649111299
- The Marines Who Wouldn't Fight (8-part syndicated series), North American Newspaper Alliance, September 1929 [ghostwritten by Dimitman]

== See also ==
- List of Medal of Honor recipients
- List of Medal of Honor recipients (Veracruz)
- List of historically notable United States Marines

== Sources ==
- Archer, Jules (1973). The Plot to Seize the White House. New York: Hawthorn Books. OCLC 663850.
- Boot, Max (2003). The Savage Wars of Peace (First Paperback ed.). Basic Books. ISBN 978-0-465-00721-9. LCCN 2004695066.
- Burk, Robert F. (1990). The Corporate State and the Broker State: The Du Ponts and American National Politics, 1925–1940. Harvard University Press. ISBN 978-0-674-17272-2.
- "Butler – Peters". The New York Times. July 1, 1905. p. 9.
- "Butler". Dictionary of American Naval Fighting Ships. Naval History & Heritage Command, Department of the Navy. Archived from the original on November 4, 2007.
- Butler, Smedley Darlington & Venzon, Anne Cipriano (1992). General Smedley Darlington Butler: The Letters of a Leatherneck, 1898–1931. Praeger. ISBN 978-0-275-94141-3.
- Conner, Owen Linlithgow (2024). "Chapter 18 - A Marine Less Ordinary: The Life of Major General Smedley D. Butler". In Conner, Owen Linlithgow (ed.). Always Faithful: 250 Years of Remarkable Stories from the Collection of the National Museum of the Marine Corps. Quantico, Virginia: Marine Corps University Press. pp. 162–178. doi:10.56686/9798987336168. ISBN 979-8-9873361-6-8.
- "Credulity Unlimited". The New York Times. November 22, 1934.
- Editors of the Boston Publishing Company (1985). Above and Beyond, A History of the Medal of Honor from the Civil War to Vietnam. Boston Publishing Company. p. 113. ISBN 978-0-8094-5628-4.
- Farwell, Byron (1993). Stonewall: A Biography of General Thomas J. Jackson. W. W. Norton & Company. ISBN 978-0-393-31086-3.
- "Gen. Butler Bares a 'Fascist Plot'". The New York Times. November 21, 1934. p. 1.
- "Smedley Butler". Military Times. Hall of Valor. Archived from the original on May 8, 2012.
- Horwitz, Tony (February 22, 1999). Confederates in the attic. Vintage. ISBN 978-0-679-75833-4.
- Klehr, Harvey (1984). The Heyday of American Communism. Basic Books. pp. 110–12, 372–73. ISBN 978-0-465-02946-4.
- Langley, Lester D. (1985). The Banana Wars: United States Intervention in the Caribbean, 1898–1934. Lexington: University Press of Kentucky. ISBN 978-0-8420-5047-0.
- "Leatherneck legends; Swapping some sea stories at the birthday ball? Here are 8 of the Corps' best". Marine Corps Times: 22. November 15, 2004.
- Lelle, John E. (1988). The Brevet Medal. Quest Publishing Co. ISBN 978-0-915779-02-4.
- "Major General Smedley D. Butler". Marine Corps Legacy Museum.
- "Major General Smedley D. Butler, USMC". Who's Who in Marine Corps History. History Division, United States Marine Corps. Archived from the original on May 8, 2013.
- "Oregon State Police History". Oregon State Police, Official Oregon State website. Archived from the original on January 17, 2008.
- "Plot Without Plotters". Time. December 3, 1934. Archived from the original on November 10, 2010.
- "Report of the Commandant of the United States Marine Corps, Marines in China: The Relief Expedition". United States Marine Corps. September 29, 1900. Archived from the original on August 10, 2006.
- Sargent, James E.; Archer, Jules (November 1974). "Review of: The Plot to Seize the White House, by Jules Archer". The History Teacher. 8 (1): 151–2. doi:10.2307/491493. JSTOR 491493.
- Schlesinger Jr., Arthur M. (2003). The Politics of Upheaval: 1935–1936, The Age of Roosevelt, Volume III (The Age of Roosevelt). Mariner Books. ISBN 978-0-618-34087-3.
- Schmidt, Hans (1987). Maverick Marine: General Smedley D. Butler and the Contradictions of American Military History. Lexington, Ky.: The University Press of Kentucky. doi:10.2307/j.ctt5vkkjh. ISBN 978-0-8131-4625-6.
- Schmidt, Hans (1995). The United States occupation of Haiti, 1915–1934 (reprint, illustrated ed.). Rutgers University Press. ISBN 978-0-8135-2203-6.
- "Smedley D. Butler Brigade Chapter 9 Veterans for Peace".
- Strecker, Mark (2011). Smedley D. Butler, USMC: A Biography (softcover ed.). McFarland & Company. ISBN 978-0-7864-4807-4.
- "Synopsis". Big Picture Media Corporation. Archived from the original on October 12, 2007.
- Thomas, Lowell (1933). Old Gimlet Eye. New York: Farrar & Rinehart. OCLC 219896546.
- Ward, Geoffrey C. "Ollie and Old Gimlet Eye". American Heritage Magazine. Archived from the original on September 13, 2007.

Government offices
Unknown	Director of Public Safety for Philadelphia; 1924–1925	Succeeded by George W. Elliott
