= History of Social Security in the United States =

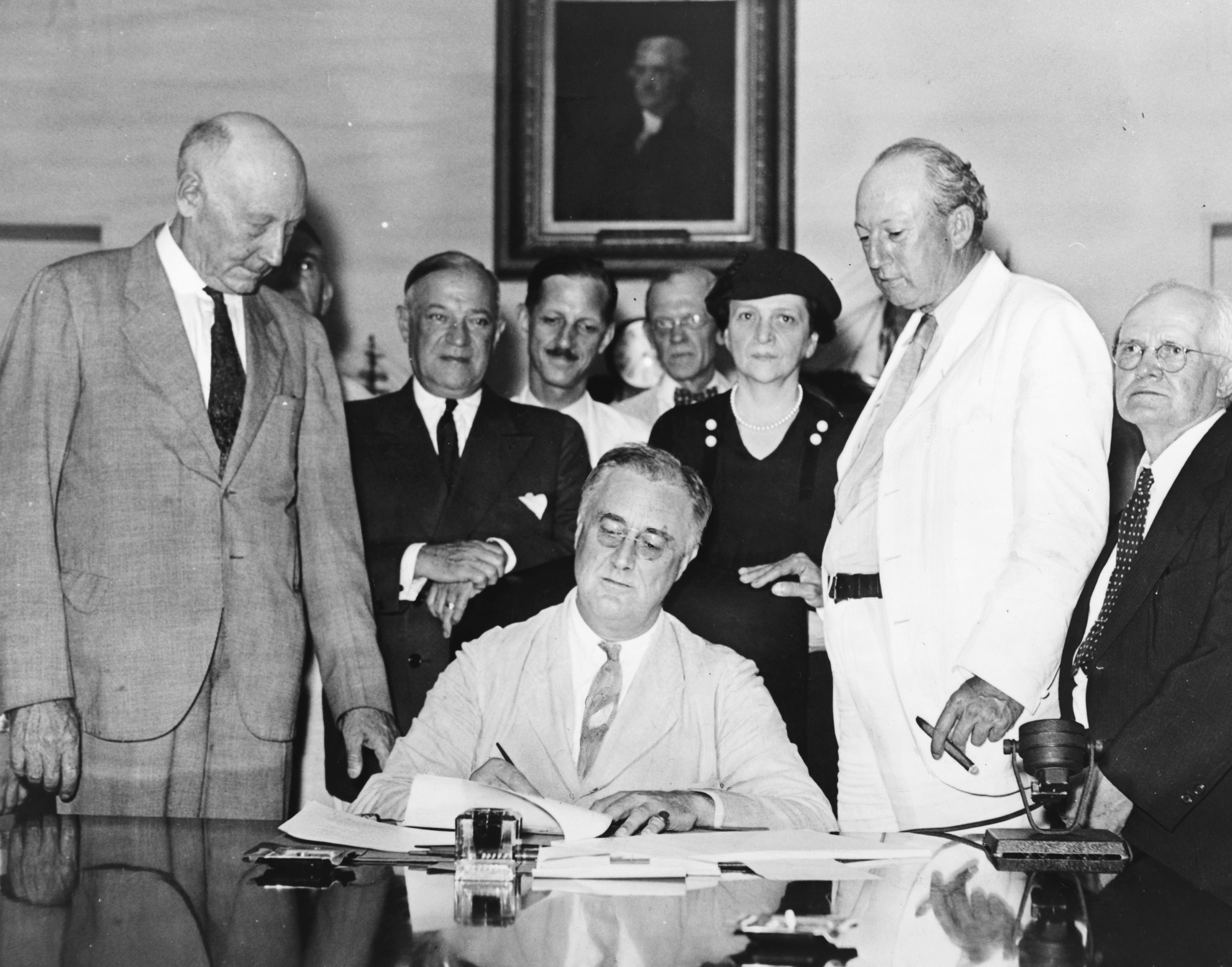
President Roosevelt signs Social Security Act, August 14, 1935. Standing are Rep. Robert Doughton (D-NC); unknown person in shadow; Sen. Robert Wagner (D-NY); Rep. John Dingell (D-MI); Rep. Joshua Twing Brooks (D-PA); the Secretary of Labor, Frances Perkins; Sen. Pat Harrison (D-MS); and Rep. David Lewis (D-MD).

A limited form of the Social Security program began as a measure to implement "social insurance" during the Great Depression of the 1930s, when poverty rates among senior citizens exceeded 50 percent.

The Social Security Act was enacted August 14, 1935 (91 years ago). The Act was drafted during President Franklin D. Roosevelt's first term by the President's Committee on Economic Security, under Frances Perkins, and passed by Congress as part of the New Deal. The Act was an attempt to limit what were seen as dangers in the modern American life, including old age, poverty, unemployment, and the burdens of widows and fatherless children. By signing this Act on August 14, 1935, President Roosevelt became the first president to advocate federal assistance for the elderly.

The Act provided benefits to retirees and the unemployed, and a lump-sum benefit at death. Payments to current retirees are financed by a payroll tax on current workers' wages, half directly as a payroll tax and half paid by the employer (self-employed people are responsible for the entire payroll tax). The act also gave money to states to provide assistance to aged individuals (Title I), for unemployment insurance (Title III), Aid to Families with Dependent Children (Title IV), Maternal and Child Welfare (Title V), public health services (Title VI), and the blind (Title X).

== Origins and design ==
Prior to the renewed effort in the wake of the Great Depression, Theodore Roosevelt had mentioned a comprehensive "social insurance" package in his New Nationalism, first espoused in 1910 in the lead up to the 1912 election. In his failed 1932 campaign for governor of Louisiana, entrepreneur and politician Dudley J. Leblanc proposed a monthly stipend for the elderly. Huey Long witnessed the popularity of the idea with Louisiana voters, and subsequently adopted it in his national platform.

Political Scientists at the University of Wisconsin–Madison, including Edwin Witte, Arthur J. Altmeyer, and Wilbur Cohen developed the 1934 proposal for a federally funded pension plan. Witte and Altmeyer have both been referred to as the "Father of Social Security," as has activist Abraham Epstein, who the Social Security Administration credited in a 1992 article as introducing the term "social security" to the United States.

This idea was later popularized by Francis Townsend in 1933, and the influence of the "Townsend Plan" movement on debate over social security persisted into the 1950s. Early debates on Social Security's design centered on how the program's benefits should be funded. Some believed that benefits to individuals should be funded by contributions that they themselves had made over the course of their careers. Others argued that this design would disadvantage those who had already begun their careers at the time of the program's implementation because they would not have enough time to accumulate adequate benefits.

=== Initial opposition ===
Social Security was controversial when originally proposed, with one point of opposition being that it would reduce the labor force, but supporters argued instead that retiring older workers would free up employment for young men, which during the Depression was a vital point of concern.

Opponents also decried the proposal as socialism. Secretary of Labor Frances Perkins wrote that during a Senate Finance Committee hearing, Senator Thomas Gore (D-OK) asked "Isn't this Socialism?" She replied that it was not, but he continued, "Isn't this a teeny-weeny bit of Socialism?"

Most women were excluded from the benefits of unemployment insurance and old age pensions. Job categories that were not covered by the act included workers in agricultural labor, domestic service, government employees, and many teachers, nurses, hospital employees, librarians, and social workers. The act also denied coverage to individuals who worked intermittently. These jobs were dominated by women and minorities. For example, women made up 90 percent of domestic labor in 1940 and two-thirds of all employed black women were in domestic service. Exclusions exempted nearly half of the working population. Nearly two-thirds of all African Americans in the labor force, 70 to 80 percent in some areas in the South, and just over half of all women employed were not covered by Social Security. At the time, the NAACP protested the Social Security Act, describing it as "a sieve with holes just big enough for the majority of Negroes to fall through."

Some writers have suggested that this discrimination resulted from the powerful position of Southern Democrats on two of the committees pivotal for the Act's creation, the Senate Finance Committee and the House Ways and Means Committee. However, other writers have disputed these arguments.

The Social Security law was very unpopular among many groups, especially farmers, who resented the additional taxes and feared they would never be made good. They lobbied hard for exclusion. Furthermore, the Treasury realized how difficult it would be to set up payroll deduction plans for farmers, for housekeepers who employed maids, and for nonprofit groups; therefore they were excluded. State employees were excluded for constitutional reasons (the federal government cannot tax state government). Federal employees were also excluded. Larry DeWitt rejects the speculation that the exclusions were the product of southern white racial hostility toward blacks; there is no evidence of that in the record. Other scholars have replicated and endorsed DeWitt's analysis, agreeing that the exclusions were made by policy experts on technical grounds and were not grounded on racial hostility. Rodems and Shaefer note in all other countries unemployment insurance programs "excluded domestic and agricultural workers when they were first implemented, a fact that the key New Deal policy makers were well aware of." The exclusions followed consultation with leading experts in Europe as well as the United States, including William Beveridge, Henry Steel-Maitland, and R.C. Davison in Britain, Andre Tixier of the International Labour Organization, and Edwin Witte, Wilbur J. Cohen, and Evelyn Burns in the United States.

Social Security reinforced traditional views of family life. Women generally qualified for benefits only through their husbands or children. Mothers' pensions (Title IV) based entitlements on the presumption that mothers would be unemployed.

Historical discrimination in the system can also be seen with regard to Aid to Dependent Children. Since this money was allocated to the states to distribute, some localities assessed black families as needing less money than white families. These low grant levels made it impossible for African American mothers to not work: one requirement of the program. Some states also excluded children born out of wedlock, an exclusion which affected African American women more than white women. One study determined that 14.4% of eligible white individuals received funding, but only 1.5 percent of eligible black individuals received these benefits.

Poor people in half the states already received small pensions. In other states they were housed in poor farms. The new law had a temporary program of Old Age Assistance that provided monthly cash payments to old people on relief. That program faded away as people qualified for Social Security.

=== Debates on the constitutionality of the Act ===
In the 1930s, the Supreme Court struck down many pieces of Roosevelt's New Deal legislation, including the Railroad Retirement Act. The Social Security Act's similarity with the Railroad Retirement Act caused Edwin Witte, the executive director of the President's Committee on Economic Security under Roosevelt who was credited as "the father of social security," to question whether or not the bill would pass; John Gall, an Associate Counsel for the National Association of Manufacturers who testified before the US House of Representatives in favor of the act, also felt that the bill was rushed through Congress too quickly and that the old age provision of the act was "hodgepodge" that needed to be written more properly in order to have a higher likelihood of being ruled constitutional. The Court threw out a centerpiece of the New Deal, the National Industrial Recovery Act, the Agricultural Adjustment Act, and New York State's minimum-wage law. President Roosevelt responded with an attempt to pack the court via the Judicial Procedures Reform Bill of 1937. On February 5, 1937, he sent a special message to Congress proposing legislation granting the President new powers to add additional judges to all federal courts whenever there were sitting judges age 70 or older who refused to retire. The practical effect of this proposal was that the President would get to appoint six new Justices to the Supreme Court (and 44 judges to lower federal courts), thus instantly tipping the political balance on the Court dramatically in his favor. The debate on this proposal was heated and widespread, and lasted over six months. Beginning with a set of decisions in March, April, and May, 1937 (including the Social Security Act cases), the Court would sustain a series of New Deal legislation.

Two Supreme Court rulings affirmed the constitutionality of the Social Security Act.

- Steward Machine Company v. Davis, 301 U.S. 548 (1937) held, in a 5–4 decision, that, given the exigencies of the Great Depression, "[It] is too late today for the argument to be heard with tolerance that in a crisis so extreme the use of the moneys of the nation to relieve the unemployed and their dependents is a use for any purpose narrower than the promotion of the general welfare". The arguments opposed to the Social Security Act (articulated by justices Butler, McReynolds, and Sutherland in their opinions) were that the social security act went beyond the powers that were granted to the federal government in the Constitution. They argued that, by imposing a tax on employers that could be avoided only by contributing to a state unemployment-compensation fund, the federal government was essentially forcing each state to establish an unemployment-compensation fund that would meet its criteria, and that the federal government had no power to enact such a program.
- Helvering v. Davis, 301 U.S. 619 (1937), decided on the same day as Steward, upheld the program because "The proceeds of both [employee and employer] taxes are to be paid into the Treasury like internal-revenue taxes generally, and are not earmarked in any way". That is, the Social Security Tax was constitutional as a mere exercise of Congress's general taxation powers.

== Implementation ==
The first reported Social Security payment was to Ernest Ackerman, a Cleveland motorman who retired only one day after Social Security began. Five cents were withheld from his pay during that period, and he received a lump-sum payout of seventeen cents from Social Security.

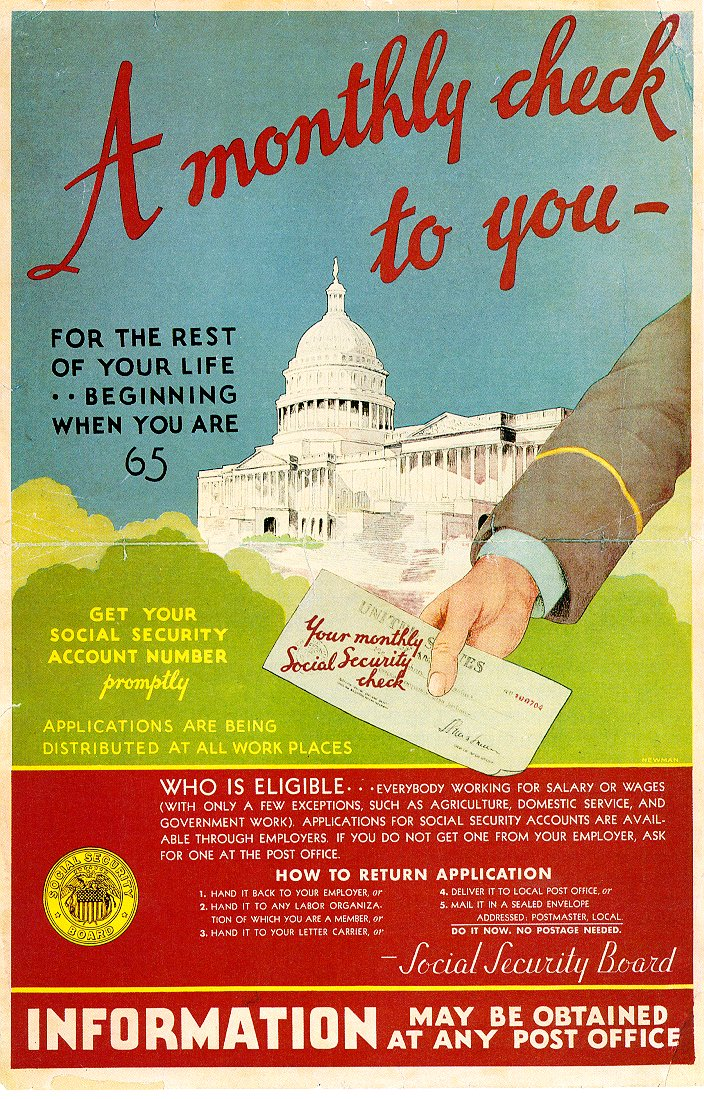
US Government-issued poster informing citizens of the Social Security program

The first monthly payment was issued on January 31, 1940 to Ida May Fuller of Ludlow, Vermont. In 1937, 1938, and 1939, she paid a total of $24.75 into the Social Security System. Her first check was for $22.54. After her second check, Fuller already had received more than she contributed over the three-year period. She ultimately reached her 100th birthday, dying in 1975, and she collected a total of $22,888.92.

== Expansion and evolution ==
The provisions of Social Security have been changing since the 1930s, shifting in response to economic worries as well as concerns over changing gender roles and the position of minorities. Officials have responded more to the concerns of women than those of minority groups. Social Security gradually moved toward universal coverage. By 1950, debates moved away from which occupational groups should be included to how to provide more adequate coverage. Changes in Social Security have reflected a balance between promoting equality and efforts to provide adequate protection.

In 1940, benefits paid totaled $35 million. These rose to $961 million in 1950, $11.2 billion in 1960, $31.9 billion in 1970, $120.5 billion in 1980, and $247.8 billion in 1990 (all figures in nominal dollars, not adjusted for inflation). In 2004, $492 billion of benefits were paid to 47.5 million beneficiaries. In 2009, nearly 51 million Americans received $650 billion in Social Security benefits.

The effects of Social Security took decades to manifest themselves. In 1950, it was reported that as many as 40% of Americans over 65 were still employed in some capacity, but by 1980 that figure had dropped to less than 20%. In 1990, fewer than 11% of Americans over 65 were still employed, an all-time low after which the number began to slowly rise again.

During the 1950s, over-65s continued to have the highest poverty rate of any age group in the US with the largest percentage of the nation's wealth concentrated in the hands of Americans under 35. By 2010, this figure had dramatically reversed itself with the largest percentage of wealth being in the hands of Americans aged 55–75 and those under 45 being among the poorest. Elder poverty, once a normal sight, had thus become rare by the 21st century.

=== 1939 Amendment ===
The amendments from 1939 transformed Social Security and added benefits for the spouses, minor children, retired workers, and benefits for the families.

==== Economic concerns ====
One reason for the proposed changes in 1939 was a growing concern over the impact that the reserves created by the 1935 act were having on the economy. The Recession of 1937 was blamed on the government, tied to the abrupt decrease in government spending and the $2 billion that had been collected in Social Security taxes. Benefits became available in 1940 instead of 1942 and changes to the benefit formula increased the amount of benefits available to all recipients in the early years of Social Security. These two policies combined to shrink the size of the reserves. The original Act had conceived of the program as paying benefits out of a large reserve. This Act shifted the conception of Social Security into something of a hybrid system; while reserves would still accumulate, most early beneficiaries would receive benefits on the pay-as-you-go system. Just as importantly, the changes also delayed planned rises in contribution rates. Ironically if these had been left in place they would have come into effect during the wartime boom in wages and would have arguably helped to temper wartime inflation.

==== Creation of the Social Security Trust Fund ====
The amendments established a trust fund for any surplus funds. The managing trustee of this fund is the Secretary of the Treasury. The money could be invested in both non-marketable and marketable securities.

==== The move toward family protection ====
Calls for reform of Social Security emerged within a few years of the 1935 Act. Even as early as 1936, some believed that women were not getting enough support. Worried that a lack of assistance might push women back into the work force, these individuals wanted Social Security changes that would prevent this. In an effort to protect the family, therefore, some called for reform which tied women's aid more concretely to their dependency on their husbands. Others expressed apprehension about the complicated administrative practices of Social Security. Concerns about the size of the reserve fund of the retirement program, emphasized by a recession in 1937, led to further calls for change.

These amendments, however, avoided the question of the large numbers of workers in excluded categories. Instead, the amendments of 1939 made family protection a part of Social Security. This included increased federal funding for the Aid to Dependent Children and raised the maximum age of children eligible to receive money under the Aid to Dependent Children to 18. The amendment added wives, elderly widows, and dependent survivors of covered male workers to those who could receive old age pensions. These individuals had previously been granted lump-sum payments upon only death or coverage through the Aid to Dependent Children program. If a married wage-earning woman's own benefit was worth less than 50% of her husband's benefit, she was treated as a wife, not a worker. If a woman who was covered by Social Security died, however, her dependents were ineligible for her benefits. Since support for widows was dependent on the husband being a covered worker, African American widows were severely underrepresented and unaided by these changes.

In order to assure fiscal conservatives who worried about the costs of adding family protection policies, the benefits for single workers were decreased and lump-sum death payments were abolished.

==== FICA ====
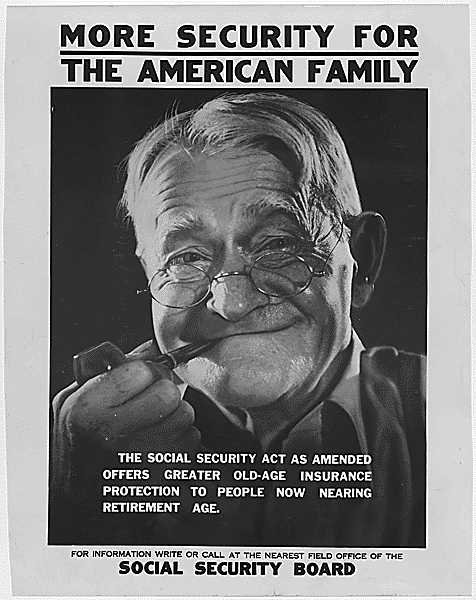
A poster for the expansion of the Social Security Act

In the original 1935 law, the benefit provisions were in Title II of the Act (which is why Social Security is sometimes referred to as the "Title II" program.) The taxing provisions were in a separate title (Title VIII) (for reasons related to the constitutionality of the 1935 Act). As part of the 1939 Amendments, the Title VIII taxing provisions were taken out of the Social Security Act and placed in the Internal Revenue Code and renamed the Federal Insurance Contributions Act (FICA). Social Security payroll taxes are thus often referred to as "FICA taxes."

=== Amendments of the 1950s and 60s ===
After years of debates about the inclusion of domestic labor, household employees working at least two days a week for the same person were added in 1950, along with nonprofit workers and the self-employed. Hotel workers, laundry workers, all agricultural workers, and state and local government employees were added in 1954.

In 1956, the tax rate was raised to 4.0 percent (2.0 percent for the employer, 2.0 percent for the employee) and disability benefits were added. Also in 1956, women were allowed to retire at 62 with benefits reduced by 25 percent. Widows of covered workers were allowed to retire at 62 without the reduction in benefits.

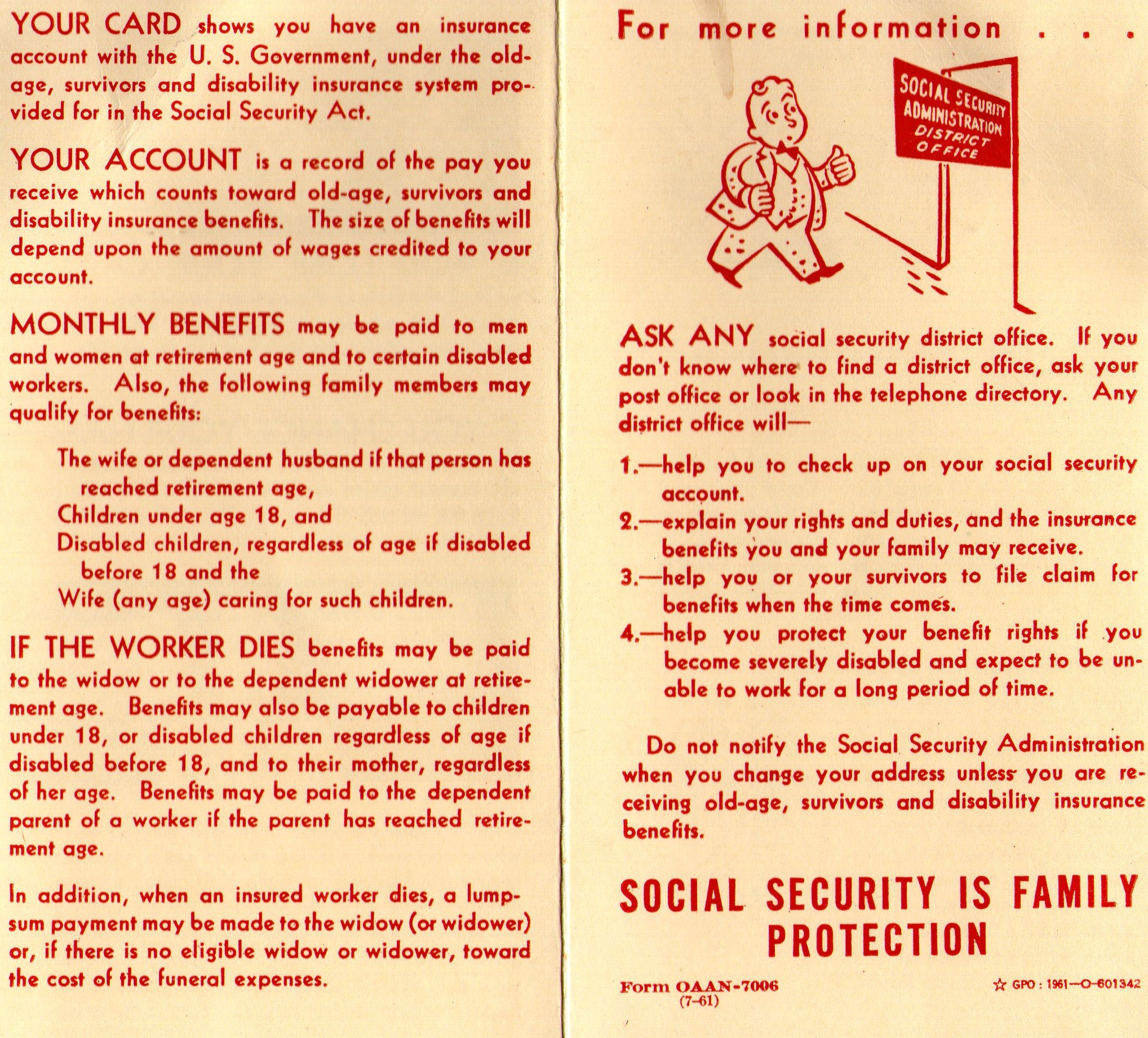
Brochure from 1961 with basic advice about Social Security cards (pages 1 and 4)

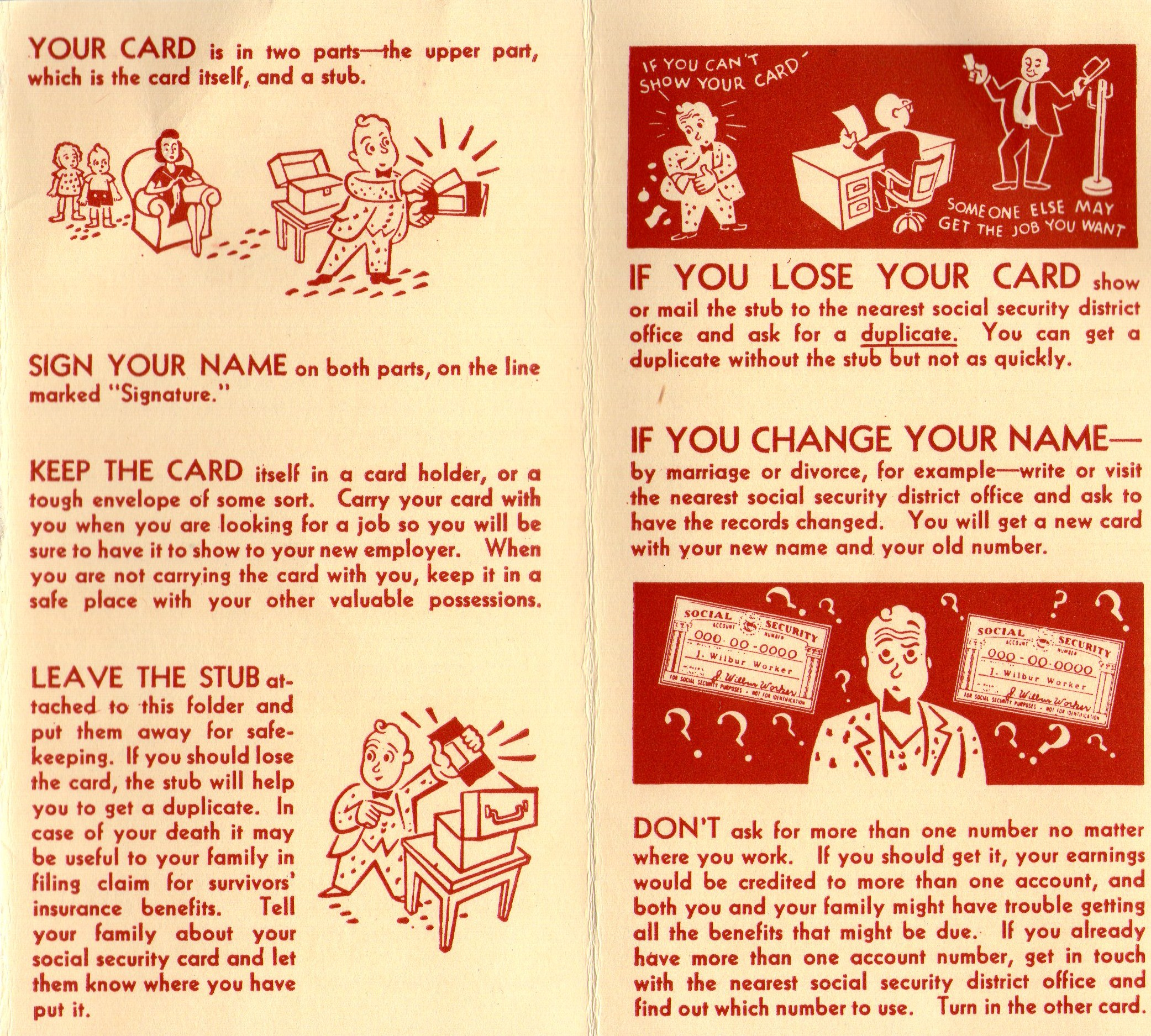
Same brochure (pages 2 and 3)

In 1961, retirement at age 62 was extended to men, and the tax rate was increased to 6.0%.

In 1962, the changing role of the female worker was acknowledged when benefits of covered women could be collected by dependent husbands, widowers, and children. These individuals, however, had to be able to prove their dependency.

Medicare and Medicaid were added in 1965 by the Social Security Act of 1965, part of President Lyndon B. Johnson's "Great Society" program.

In 1965, the age at which widows could begin collecting benefits was reduced to 60. Widowers were not included in this change. When divorce, rather than death, became the major cause of marriages ending, divorcées were added to the list of recipients. Divorcées over the age of 65 who had been married for at least 20 years, remained unmarried, and could demonstrate dependency on their ex-husbands received benefits.

The government adopted a unified budget in the Johnson administration in 1968. This change resulted in a single measure of the fiscal status of the government, based on the sum of all government activity. The surplus in Social Security trust funds offsets the total debt, making it appear much smaller than it otherwise would. This allowed Congress to increase spending without having to risk the political consequences of raising taxes.

=== Amendments of the 1970s ===
==== 1972 Amendments ====
In June 1972, both houses of the United States Congress approved by overwhelming majorities 20% increases in benefits for 27.8 million Americans. The average payment per month rose from $133 to $166. The bill also set up a cost-of-living adjustment (COLA) to take effect in 1975. This adjustment would be made on a yearly basis if the Consumer Price Index (CPI) increased by 3% or more. This addition was an attempt to index benefits to inflation so that benefits would rise automatically. If inflation was 5%, the goal was to automatically increase benefits by 5% so their real value didn't decline. A technical error in the formula caused these adjustments to overcompensate for inflation, a technical mistake which has been called double-indexing. The COLAs actually caused benefits to increase at twice the rate of inflation.

In October 1972, a $5 billion piece of Social Security legislation was enacted which expanded the Social Security program. For example, minimum monthly benefits of individuals employed in low income positions for at least 30 years were raised. Increases were also made to the pensions of 3.8 million widows and dependent widowers.

These amendments also established the Supplemental Security Income (SSI). SSI is not a Social Security benefit, but a welfare program, because the elderly and disabled poor are entitled to SSI regardless of work history. Likewise, SSI is not an entitlement, because there is no right to SSI payments.

Throughout the 1950s and 1960s, during the phase-in period of Social Security, Congress was able to grant generous benefit increases because the system had perpetual short-run surpluses. Congressional amendments to Social Security took place in even numbered years (election years) because the bills were politically popular, but by the late 1970s, this era was over. For the next three decades, projections of Social Security's finances would show large, long-term deficits, and in the early 1980s, the program flirted with immediate insolvency. From this point on, amendments to Social Security would take place in odd numbered years (years that were not election years) because Social Security reform now meant tax increases and benefit reductions. Social Security became known as the "Third Rail of American Politics." Touching it meant political death.

Several effects came together in the years following the 1972 amendments which rapidly changed the outlook on Social Security's long-term financial picture from positive to problematic. By the 1970s, the phase-in period, during which workers were paying taxes but few were collecting benefits, was largely over, and the ratio of elderly population to the working population was increasing. These developments brought questions about the capacity of the long-term financial structure based on a pay-as-you-go program.

During the Carter administration, the economy suffered double-digit inflation, coupled with very high interest rates, oil and energy crises, high unemployment and slow economic growth. Productivity growth in the United States had declined to an average annual rate of 1%, compared to an average annual rate increase of 3.2% during the 1960s. There was also a growing federal budget deficit which increased to $66 billion. The 1970s are described as a period of stagflation, meaning economic stagnation coupled with price inflation, as well as higher interest rates. Price inflation (a rise in the general level of prices) creates uncertainty in budgeting and planning and makes labor strikes for pay raises more likely. These underlying negative trends were exacerbated by a colossal mathematical error made in the 1972 amendments establishing the COLAs. The mathematical error which overcompensated for inflation was particularly detrimental given the double-digit inflation of this period, and the error led to benefit increases that were nowhere near financially sustainable.

The high inflation, double-indexing, and lower than expected wage growth was financial disaster for Social Security.

==== 1977 Amendments ====
To combat the declining financial outlook, in 1977 Congress passed and Carter signed legislation fixing the double-indexing mistake. This amendment also altered the tax formulas to raise more money, increasing withholding to 6.15%. With these changes, President Carter remarked, "Now this legislation will guarantee that from 1980 to the year 2030, the Social Security funds will be sound." This turned out not to be the case. The financial picture declined almost immediately and by the early 1980s, the system was again in crisis.

=== 1983 Amendments ===
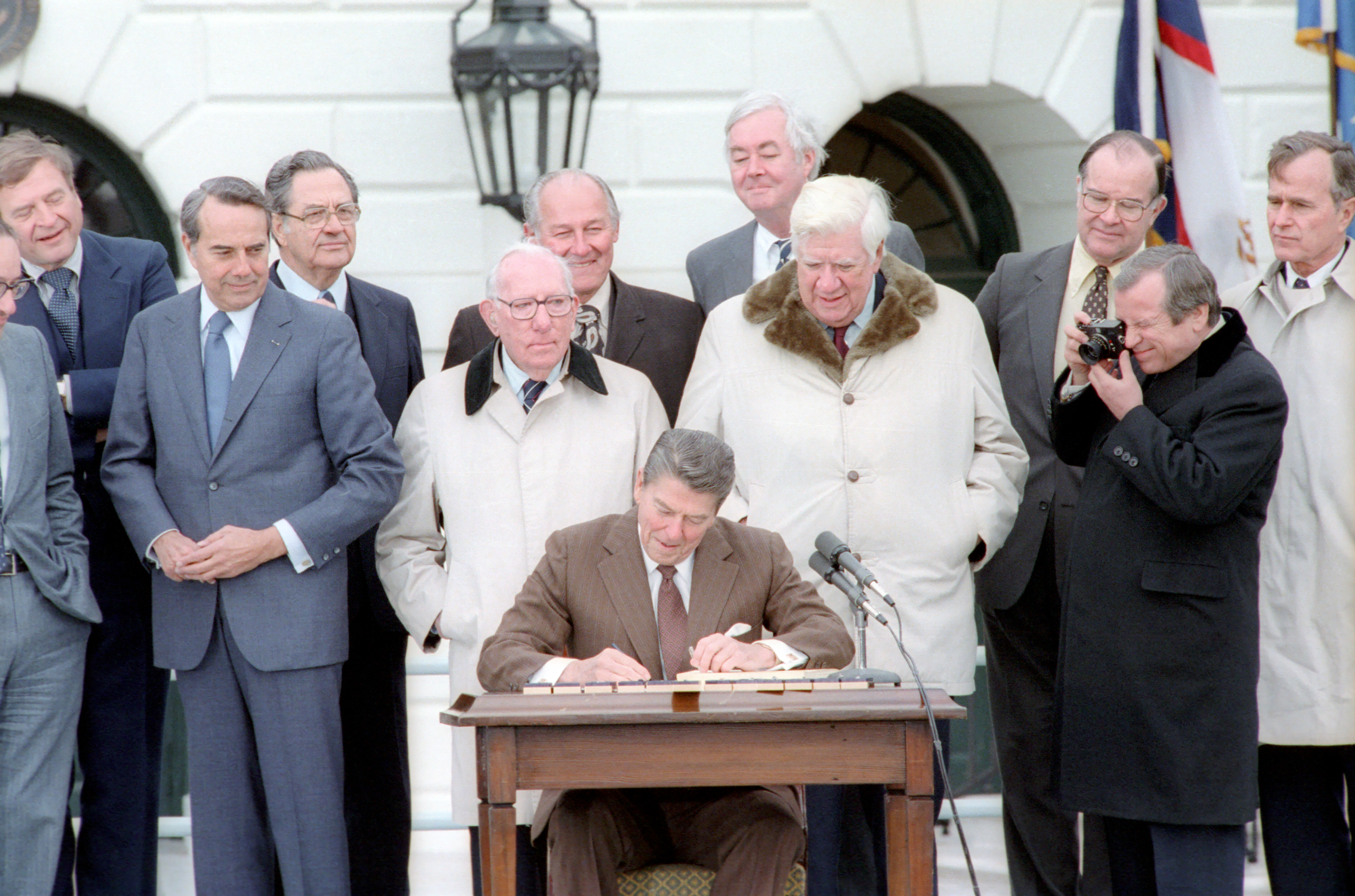
President Ronald Reagan signing the Social Security Amendments Act of 1983

After the 1977 amendments, the economic assumptions surrounding Social Security projections continued to be overly optimistic as the program moved toward a crisis. For example, COLAs were attached to increases in the CPI. This meant that they changed with prices, instead of wages. Before the 1970s, wage measurements exceeded changes in price. In the 1970s, however, this reversed and real wages decreased. This meant that FICA revenues could not keep up with the increasing benefits that were being given out. Continued high unemployment levels also lowered the amount of Social Security tax that could be collected. These two developments were decreasing the Social Security Trust Fund reserves. In 1982, projections indicated that the Social Security Trust Fund would run out of money by 1983, and there was talk of the system being unable to pay benefits.

The National Commission on Social Security Reform (NCSSR), chaired by Alan Greenspan, was empaneled to investigate the long-run solvency of Social Security. The 1983 Amendments to the SSA were based on the NCSSR's Final Report. The NCSSR recommended enacting a six-month delay in the COLA and changing the tax-rate schedules for the years between 1984 and 1990. It also proposed an income tax on the Social Security benefits of higher-income individuals. This meant that benefits in excess of a household income threshold, generally $25,000 for singles and $32,000 for couples (the precise formula computes and compares three different measures) became taxable. These changes were important for generating revenue in the short term.

Also of concern was the long-term prospect for Social Security because of demographic considerations. Of particular concern was the issue of what would happen when people born during the post–World War II baby boom retired. The NCSSR made several recommendations for addressing the issue. Under the 1983 amendments to Social Security, a previously enacted increase in the payroll tax rate was accelerated, additional employees were added to the system, the full-benefit retirement age was slowly increased, and up to one-half of the value of the Social Security benefit was made potentially taxable income.

==== Social Security Trust Fund ====
The Social Security Trust Fund has also toggled back-and-forth between being treated for accounting purposes as an "off-budget" item to an "on-budget" item—broadly speaking, whether the Trust Fund is to be included in calculations used to determine budget surpluses, deficits, or whether a given budget is considered "balanced". When the President or Congress pursue a "Unified Budget" approach, the Trust Fund is considered on-budget. Historically:

- Social Security was off-budget from 1935-1968
- On-budget from 1969-1985
- Off-budget from 1986-1990, for all purposes except computing the deficit
- Off-budget for all purposes since 1990

As a result of these changes, and particularly also due to tax increases, the Social Security system began to generate a large short-term surplus of funds in the early 1980s, intended to cover the added retirement costs of "baby boomers". Congress invested these surpluses into special series, non-marketable U.S. Treasury securities held by the Social Security Trust Fund. Under the law, the government bonds held by Social Security are backed by the full faith and credit of the U.S. government.

=== 2020s OASI anticipated shortfall ===
In the 2020s, political discussion began to grow around the anticipated inability of social security to pay the full amount of retirement benefits beginning in the year 2032. The Social Security Trustees Report of 2026 projected that the OASI Trust Fund would deplete its reserves in the fourth quarter of 2032 (one quarter earlier than they estimated in 2025). At that point, incoming tax revenues would only cover 78% of scheduled retirement and survivor benefits. Prominent members of the 119th Congress including the Speaker of the House have commented on the issue and its importance to be addressed. Political options to deal with the shortfall have ranged from increasing the retirement age and lifting the cap on taxation, set at $184,500 as of 2026.

The 119th Congress introduced the bipartisan Protecting Retirement Opportunities and Maintaining Income Security for Everyone (PROMISE) Act, which establishes a set of procedures upon which the basis for the updated rules for social security benefits will pass. A key element of the PROMISE Act is to have a baseline 50 year solvency plan for any plan to be considered. Meaning the new deal passed will ensure benefits to the year 2083.

== The Supreme Court and the evolution of Social Security ==
The Supreme Court has established that no one has any legal right to Social Security benefits. The Court decided, in Flemming v. Nestor (1960), that "entitlement to Social Security benefits is not a contractual right". In that case, Ephram Nestor, a Bulgarian immigrant to the United States who made contributions for covered wages for the statutorily required "quarters of coverage" was nonetheless denied benefits after being deported in 1956 for being a member of the Communist party.

The case specifically held:

2. A person covered by the Social Security Act has not such a right in old-age benefit payments as would make every defeasance of "accrued" interests violative of the Due Process Clause of the Fifth Amendment. Pp. 608–611. (a) The noncontractual interest of an employee covered by the Act cannot be soundly analogized to that of the holder of an annuity, whose right to benefits are based on his contractual premium payments. Pp. 608–610. (b) To engraft upon the Social Security System a concept of "accrued property rights" would deprive it of the flexibility and [363 U.S. 603, 604] boldness in adjustment to ever-changing conditions which it demands and which Congress probably had in mind when it expressly reserved the right to alter, amend or repeal any provision of the Act. Pp. 610–611. 3. Section 202 (n) of the Act cannot be condemned as so lacking in rational justification as to offend due process. Pp. 611–612. 4. Termination of appellee's benefits under 202 (n) does not amount to punishing him without a trial, in violation of Art. III, 2, cl. 3, of the Constitution or the Sixth Amendment; nor is 202 (n) a bill of attainder or ex post facto law, since its purpose is not punitive. Pp. 612–621.[65]

The Supreme Court was also responsible for major changes in Social Security. Many of these cases were pivotal in changing the assumptions about differences in wage earning among men and women in the Social Security system.

- Goldberg v. Kelly (1970): The Supreme Court ruled that the due process clause of the Fourteenth Amendment required there to be an evidentiary hearing before a recipient can be deprived of government benefits.
- Weinberger v. Wiesenfeld (1975): Stephen Wiesenfeld was a widower who claimed that he was entitled to his deceased wife's benefit. Before this case a widow and her children were eligible for her husband's Social Security benefits; however, if a wife died only her children and not the widower could receive benefits. Wiesenfeld believed that this violated his right to equal protection under the due process clause of the 14th Amendment. The court upheld his claims, stating that automatically granting widows the benefits and denying them to widowers violated equal protection in the Fourteenth Amendment.

== Dates of coverage for various workers ==
- 1935 All workers in commerce and industry (except railroads) under age 65.
- 1939 Age restriction eliminated; sailors, bank employees added; food-processing workers removed
- 1946 Railroad and Social Security earnings combined to determine eligibility for and amount of survivor benefits.
- 1950 Regularly employed farm and domestic workers. Nonfarm self-employed (except professional groups). Federal civilian employees not under retirement system. Americans employed outside United States by American employer. Puerto Rico and Virgin Islands. At the option of the State, State and local government employees not under retirement system. Nonprofit organizations could elect coverage for their employees (other than ministers).
- 1951 Railroad workers with less than 10 years of service, for all benefits. (After October 1951, coverage is retroactive to 1937.)
- 1954 Farm self-employed. Professional self-employed except lawyers, dentists, doctors, and other medical groups. Additional regularly employed farm and domestic workers. Homeworkers. State and local government employees (except firefighters and police officers) under retirement system if agreed to by referendum. Ministers could elect coverage as self-employed.
- 1956 Members of the uniformed services. Remainder of professional self-employed except doctors. By referendum, firefighters and police officers in designated States.
- 1965 Interns. Self-employed doctors. Tips.
- 1967 Ministers (unless exemption is claimed on grounds of conscience or religious principles). Firefighters under retirement system in all States.
- 1972 Members of a religious order subject to a vow of poverty.
- 1983 All federal civilian employees hired after 1983; members of Congress, the President and Vice-President and federal judges; all employees of nonprofit organizations. Covered state and local government employees prohibited from opting out of Social Security.
- 1990 Employees of state and local governments not covered under a retirement plan.

== See also ==
- Michael M. Davis
- Isidore Sydney Falk
- Frances Perkins
- History of poverty in the United States
- United States labor law
