= Isidore Sydney Falk =

Isidore Sydney Falk (September 30, 1899 – October 4, 1984) was a prominent United States public health expert and advocate for national health care policies. He had a long career spanning over 60 years in health care and was involved in efforts to enact the Social Security system. Falk worked as a bacteriologist and served as a professor of public health at Yale University. He was known for his activism on behalf of national health insurance and had a multifaceted career as a researcher, government administrator, and consultant.

== Career ==
Born in Brooklyn, New York, September 30, 1899, to Sampson and Rose Falk. He married Ruth Hill in March of 1920 and had three children. He was director of surveys for Chicago Department of Health. From 1925 to 1927, he served as chief researcher for the Committee on the Costs of Medical Care. In 1929, Falk worked at the University of Chicago as a microbiologist and later at Yale School of Medicine as professor of public health. He worked on the design of the Social Security Act as part of the Council on Economic Security in 1934. He held a position with the Social Security Board (United States) from the late 1930s, becoming director of the research and statistics division of the Social Security Administration. He was executive director of the Community Health Care Center Plan from 1970 to 1979.

== Contributions to Public Health ==
Falk was instrumental in shaping health care policy and research in the United States. He collaborated with other notable figures such as Edgar Sydenstricker and Michael M. Davis on various health care initiatives. He conducted several large-scale morbidity studies and health care surveys. In the New Deal era 1930s he was an advocate for comprehensive, government-sponsored health insurance. The American Medical Association led the opposition and defeated his proposals. He called for the restructuring of health care delivery through group practice prepayment plans (an early versions of health maintenance organizations).

After 1945 Falk conducted public health and medical care surveys for international organizations, including the World Bank, in various countries.

== See also ==
- History of Social Security in the United States
