= History of poverty in the United States =

After a decline in the 1960s, poverty rates remained in a relatively stable range in subsequent decades.

The history of poverty in the United States covers poor people and antipoverty efforts from the colonial era to the 1990s. The history of poverty and social welfare in the United States begins when England started planning its new colonies and these issues are deeply intertwined with the major political, economic, and social developments that have shaped the American experience.

== Women-headed households ==
Throughout American history, female-headed households had much higher poverty rates compared to their male-headed counterparts. They had fewer assets and much lower incomes, and had multiple children to care for. Many had been servants and had no inherited wealth. This economic vulnerability rendered them the most frequent recipients of support and subjects of intervention from external agents, including Informal aid from kinship networks, charity provided by churches and voluntary organizations, and poor relief administered by local governments.

== African Americans and racial inequality ==
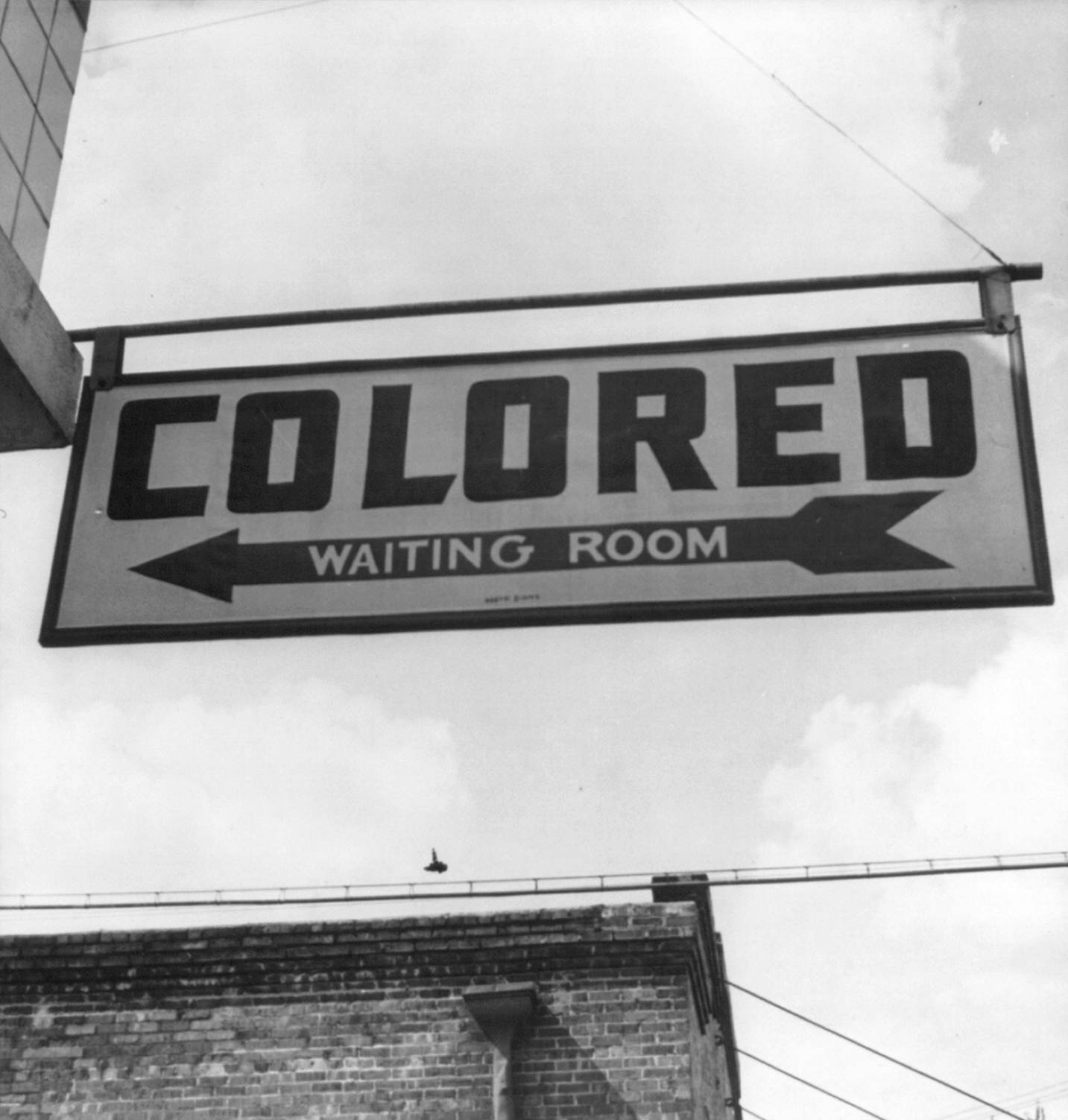
1943 Colored Waiting Room Sign

Before the 1808 abolition of the transatlantic slave trade, Africans would be brought into the United States as enslaved people, depriving them of all property, and in some cases family. In order to prevent rebellion or escape, the slave codes in some states banned education of slaves, especially teaching a slave to read or write. Free African Americans owned around $50 million by 1860.

Slavery was abolished in 1865 with no compensation to owners or ex-slaves. Redistribution of land from white owners to the freedmen was attempted briefly under the forty acres and a mule policy of Union General William Tecumseh Sherman. This was reversed by President Andrew Johnson, a Southerner who also opposed political rights for African Americans .

The Freedmen's Bureau was created as part of the War Department by President Abraham Lincoln to provide shelter and supplies to freed slaves. It was supported by the Republican Congress over the veto of President Johnson, but was soon de-funded and abandoned by a Democratic-controlled Congress in 1872.

After the Civil War the Freedman's Bank helped to foster wealth accumulation for African Americans. However, it failed in 1874, and depositors lost most of their money. This sharply lowered the available support African Americans had to open businesses and acquire wealth.

Poverty was massive in 1940, according to Gunnar Myrdal in his famous study of An American Dilemma (1944):

Except for a small minority enjoying upper- or middle-class status, the masses of American Negroes, in the rural South and in the segregated slum quarters in Southern and Northern cities, have been destitute. . . . They own little property; even their household goods are usually inadequate and dilapidated. Their incomes are not only low, but irregular. Thus they live from day to day and have scant security for the future.

The main cause, argued Myrdal and his team, was that most Blacks were based in a backward poverty stricken part of the South:

Negroes are concentrated in the South, which is generally a poor and economically retarded region. A disproportionate number of them work in agriculture, which is a depressed occupation. Most rural Negroes are in Southern cotton agriculture, which is particularly overpopulated, backward in production methods, and hard hit by soil exhaustion, by the boll weevil, and by a long-time fall in international demand for American cotton. In addition, few Negro farmers own the land they work on, and the little land they do own is much poorer and less well equipped than average Southern farms. Most Negro farmers are concentrated in the lowest occupations in agriculture as sharecroppers or wage laborers.

From the era of escaped slaves to the present, homelessness has been a major factor in Black poverty.

== Colonial era ==
In the early history of the United States, poverty was deeply rooted in the foundational processes of European settlement, including immigration, conquest, and the widespread use of enforced labor. Even as poverty became a more common experience, this era simultaneously fostered the powerful notion of America as a "land of plenty" and the birthplace of a revolutionary ideology. This ideology—centered on freedom and opportunity—would later be utilized by future generations to challenge persistent social and economic inequalities and the poverty they created. The English perception was heavily influenced by promotional efforts in sixteenth- and seventeenth-century Europe. Richard Hakluyt, an English social theorist, argued in his Discourse on Western Planting (1584) that colonizing America would serve as a crucial outlet for the children of England's "wandering beggars," providing them a place to be "unladen" and "better bred up." Gabriel Thomas, in his Historical and Geographical Account of the Province and Country of Pensilvania (1698), described Pennsylvania as a place where poor people could earn three times the wages they would in England or Wales. He further painted a picture of abundance, noting cheap and plentiful food, attractive children, and harmonious residents who "live friendly and well together."

Large numbers of vagabonds were among the convicts transported to the American colonies in the 18th century. Many became homeless.

All the colonies had systems for poor relief, usually as variations on the English model that emphasized the local parish. According to Carol Haber, in the eighteenth century:

The family system of support could not meet the needs of all the poverty-stricken. Especially in large cities, aged paupers were placed in public almshouses, often composing one-quarter to one-half of the institutionalized inmates. Generally, these were the most broken and ancient of the senescent; their all too apparent infirmities served as a clear sign of their need for charitable attention. Thus, unlike the able bodied or the vagrant, such elderly persons were not made the target of the public's contempt. Their decrepit state left little doubt that they were worthy recipients of the community's care.

Colonial North Carolina was almost entirely rural. It had a few rich planters with numerous slaves, but largely comprised subsistence white farmers. They typically lived in small log huts, lit only by smokey pine-knot candles. A few owned slaves. Poverty was rare. Land was cheap and the warm climate gave a long growing season and a mild winter. Families produced their own food and traded with neighbors. “Provisions here are extremely cheap and extremely good, so that people may live plentifully at a trifling expense,” noted William Byrd, a close observer. “In truth it is the Best poor mans Cuntry I Ever heard of,” one resident wrote in 1770.

== 1775 to 1860 ==
=== Veterans ===
Starting with the Revolutionary War, servicemen who had significant injuries or were unable to provide for their household were financially supported by the first pension law, which was enacted by the Continental Congress in August 1776. It provided half pay for life or during disability for veterans who were so badly disabled during their service as to be incapable of earning a living. Veterans with partial disability received partial benefits. Similar laws covered all later veterans. The income or poverty of the recipient was not qa factor. After World War I, there was a major grass roots effort for paying a "Bonus" to all its veterans, resulting in the World War Adjusted Compensation Act of 1924 and especially the Adjusted Compensation Payment Act of 1936. It was passed over a President Franklin Roosevelt's veto and paid out $1.5 billion in cash and bonds (2% of GNP) to all the living veterans of 1917-1919, regardless of their needs.

=== Jefferson on inequality, poverty and civic duty ===
During the 1770s and 1780s Thomas Jefferson took the lead in ending what he viewed as the feudal and aristocratic laws that threatened to create in Virginia a small landed aristocracy of the sort that controlled the best farmland in England and made for poverty of the masses. The key was the abolition of primogeniture which said the eldest son would inherit all the family land when the father died without a will. The new law said land would be divided equally among all sons and daughters. Another new law abolished entail, a policy in which a man's will could specify that the estate would never be sold, mortgaged or divided up. The result was that Virginia would not see massive inequality with a small elite controlling most of the farmland. In the Louisiana Purchase of 1803, Jefferson acquired 530 million acres with enough good farmland for future generations of ambitious yeoman farmers. Congress helped them purchase this land by halving the minimum purchase, and extending credit.

Jefferson viewed poverty as a significant societal challenge in the new nation. He argued in 1826 that assistance to the needy was a civic duty. He was narrowly focused on white men. Small farmers every year gambled their herds and crops against disease and drought to feed their families and the nation. He recommended localized poor relief systems, believing aid was best administered by local communities rather than a centralized national authority. He considered beggars as morally suspect and placed them outside the bounds of organized, legitimate charity. Jefferson maintained an optimistic outlook regarding the efficacy of the nascent American poor-relief system. Nonetheless, poverty remained a persistent, endemic issue throughout the early nation, highlighting a gap between his idealized vision for relief and the on-the-ground reality.

=== Religious charities ===
The largest Catholic charity Society of Saint Vincent de Paul has a global base. In the U.S. it was started by Irish immigrants in the 1850s. Membership in the United States in 2015 exceeded 97,000 volunteers in 4,400 communities. Expenditures to people in poverty were $474 million. Programs include visits to homes, prisons, and hospitals, housing assistance, disaster relief, job training and placement, food pantries, dining halls, clothing, transportation and utility costs, care for the elderly, and medicine. Revenue is raised through a large network of thrift stores.

=== Poor houses and poor farms ===
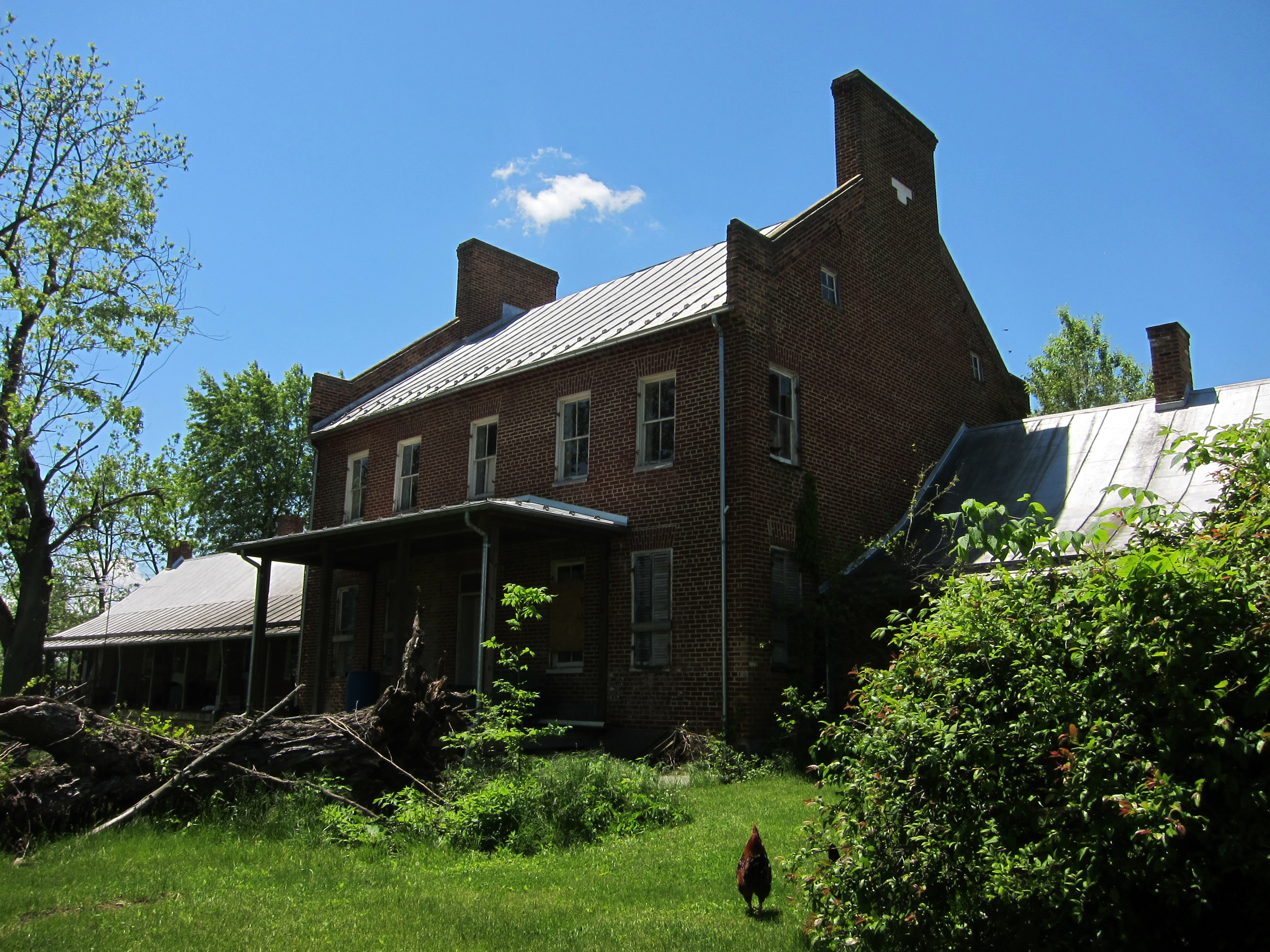
Frederick County Poor Farm in Virginia

Poor houses or almshouses and their rural counterpart, poor farms, were dominant public welfare institutions in the United States throughout the 19th and early 20th centuries. These facilities were deliberately designed to be "spartan and uncomfortable" to encourage residents to work their way out of poverty, reflecting the societal stigma and shame placed on the indigent. They served as a local solution to poverty before the establishment of modern federal welfare programs like Social Security and Medicaid. Poor farms were typically working farms where able-bodied residents were required to labor in the fields and perform housekeeping/care tasks to the extent their health allowed. The terminology for this sort of residential welfare was "indoor relief"; cash payments made to poor people living on their own was called "outdoor relief."

Poor houses were common during the 19th and early 20th centuries. These locally-run public institutions were the major instrument to deal with poverty . They were intended to be "spartan and uncomfortable" as a way to convince paupers of the value of working themselves out of poverty. As governments sought to relocate the poor beneficiaries outside of city centers to more rural areas, poorhouses became known as poor farms, which in effect exposed the "stigma and shame society placed on those who were unable to support themselves".

Poor farms were based on the American tradition of county governments (rather than cities, townships, or state or federal governments) providing social services for the needy within their borders. Following the 1854 veto of the Bill for the Benefit of the Indigent Insane by President Franklin Pierce, the federal government did not participate in social welfare for over 70 years. In a poor-farm system, indigent people were often situated on the grounds of a farm in which able-bodied residents were required to work. A poorhouse could even be part of the same economic complex as a prison farm and other penal or charitable public institutions. Most were working farms that produced at least some of the produce, grain, and livestock they consumed. Residents were expected to provide labor to the extent that their health would allow, both in the fields and by providing housekeeping and care for other residents. Rules were strict and accommodations minimal.

The poor farms declined in the U.S. after the Social Security Act took effect in 1935, with most disappearing by 1950. Since the 1970s, funding for the care, well-being and safety of the poor and indigent is now split among county, state and federal resources. Poor farms have been replaced by subsidized housing such as public housing projects, Section 8 housing, and homeless shelters.

== 1860 to 1900 ==
=== Confederacy 1861–1865 ===
By mid-1861, the Union naval blockade virtually shut down the export of cotton and the import of manufactured goods. Food that formerly came from more than a few hundred miles was largely cut off. By 1863 refugees had swollen the population of Southern cities large and small, and severe food shortages depressed productivity and morale. Richmond, Virginia, the rebellion's national capital, was at the end of a long, vulnerable supply line. It became the main target of Union war effort, and starvation was a real threat. Food riots broke out.

The Confederate Army was also affected. The combat armies on the march never had enough tents, shoes, horses or wagons. Soldiers slept in the open, wore tattered uniforms, and marched barefoot to save their shoes for use in battle. Food supplies were erratic, and the troops often went hungry. However, thanks to new factories and the British blockade runners, they did have enough weapons and gunpowder. Desertion grew steadily, as soldiers realized their families back home could not survive without them.

As women were the ones who remained at home, they had to make do with the lack of food and supplies. They cut back on purchases, used old materials, and planted more flax and peas to provide clothing and food. They used ersatz substitutes when possible. The households were severely hurt by inflation in the cost of everyday items like flour, and the shortages of food, fodder for the animals, and medical supplies for the wounded.

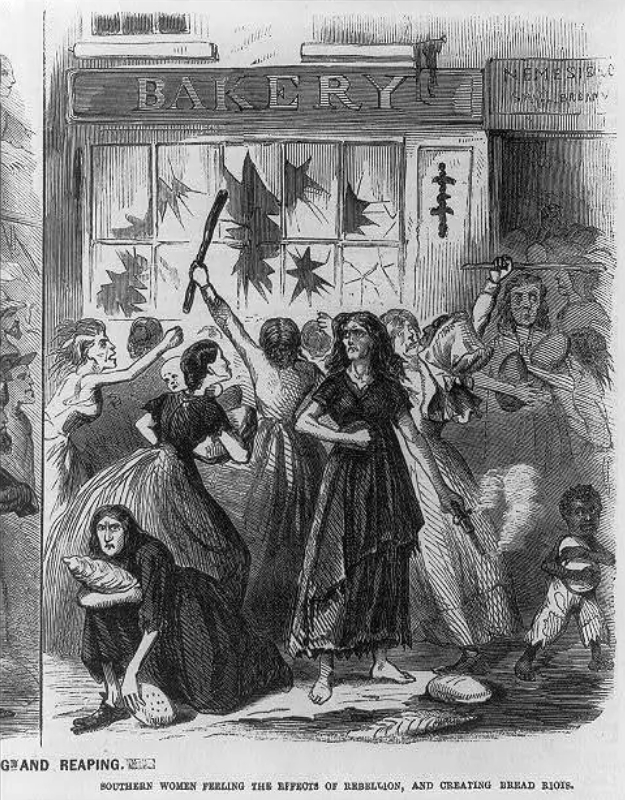
Richmond bread riot, 1863

State governments requested that planters grow less cotton and more food. However most refused because they predicted that as cotton prices soared in Europe, Britain and France would soon intervene to break the blockade and make them rich. Cotton prices did soar but Europe remained neutral. The Georgia legislature imposed cotton quotas, making it a crime to grow an excess. But food shortages only worsened, especially in the towns.

The overall decline in food supplies, made worse by the collapsing transportation system, led to serious shortages and high prices in urban areas. When bacon reached a dollar a pound in 1863, the poor women of Richmond, Atlanta and many other Confederate cities began to riot; they broke into shops and warehouses to seize food. As wives and widows of soldiers, they were hurt by the inadequate welfare system.

=== Postwar South: Sharecroppers ===
Defeat in spring 1865 ended the war and brought the soldiers home, but it did not end the poverty and depredations. Washington set up a major relief program for the newly freed blacks, but gave limited help to whites. Many small white farmers, or yeomen, were thrown into poverty by the war, a stark change from their previous subsistence farming.

A group especially vulnerable to poverty consisted of poor sharecroppers and tenant farmers across the South. These farmers consisted of around a fourth of the South's population, and over a third of them were African Americans. The grew some of the own food alongside a commercial crop—cotton usually, or tobacco—on land they did not own. Local merchants lent them food and supplies during the year. They harvested the cotton, and turned it over to the merchant to pay their store debt, and in turn he paid half the sale to the landowner.

=== Orphanages ===
Orphanages were rare in colonial America but then became gradually popular with the realization that the children should not live with the adults in poorhouses. The earliest orphanages were typically private, religiously affiliated institutions that formed as a reaction to the harsh living conditions experienced by children in public poorhouses. The first orphanage in the United States colonies was founded in 1729 in connection with the Ursuline Convent in New Orleans with a mission to care for French orphans and convert local natives and enslaved African girls. In 1790, the Charleston Orphan House opened the first public orphanage in the country. Similar orphanages were set up by faith-based organizations that catered to the needs of their respective ethnic and religious communities.

Between 1800 and 1830, only fifteen orphanages opened in the United States, most of them led by members of the Protestant faith. These institutions became increasingly important with immigration, urban poverty, and public health crises like cholera epidemics in the mid-1800s. The Catholics began in 1806 in Philadelphia. There were 75 Catholic orphanages nationwide in 1860 and over 250 in 1900.

About a fourth of children in nineteenth-century orphanages had lost both their parents; more than half had one living parent, and a fifth had two living parents. Desperately poor parents left their children at orphanages in hard times, usually temporarily. These children lived by begging, committing petty crimes, and selling newspapers; they slept in alleys or sewers. Many joined violent street gangs. It was this massive social problem that ushered in the age of orphan asylums.

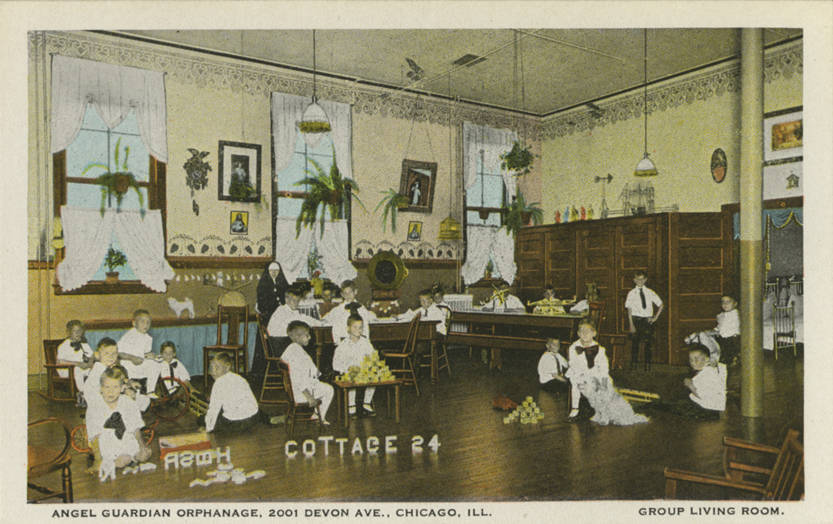
Angel Guardian Orphanage in Chicago, for Catholic boys. (1922)

After the Civil War, state and local governments became deeply involved in regulating and founding orphanages across the country. The primary drivers of this increased involvement was the need to provide for war orphans, the growing opposition to placing children in poorhouses, and the development of new child abuse laws and enforcement machinery. During this period, religion and race remained the central considerations that shaped how orphan asylums were organized, resulting in a child welfare system in which the services a child received depended heavily on their religious background, nationality, and racial identity. Conflicts among smaller groups created further subdivisions among these institutions. Notable cases include the split between Lutheran immigrants from Scandinavaia and Germany, as well as Russian Orthodox Jews and German-descended Reform Jews who disagreed with how Reform Jews have attempted to "Americanize" orphan children under their care.

==== Catholic orphanages ====
Catholic orphanages were typically run by nun congregations and primarily served children of French Canadian, German, Irish, Italian or Polish descent. By 1885 they operated 272 orphan asylums and 46 industrial schools for teenagers, in addition to 154 hospitals, along with 37 homes for the aged. They had a large presence in every major city. For example in 1886 the St. Vincent Orphanage in Cleveland, Ohio, had operated for over 30 years. It housed 20 German and Irish Catholic boys. Sometimes both parents were dead; more often the family was too poor to take care of them. The boys were not up for adoption; they returned home if the family economy improved. The facility was staffed by 30 Sisters of Charity of St. Augustine, and was funded by the Diocese of Cleveland. By 1923 Catholics nationwide operated 558 orphanages with 81,000 children. They placed another 10,500 in foster homes.

==== Protestant orphanages ====
Protestants built fewer orphanages than the Catholics, but patronized many public institutions.

==== Jewish orphanages ====
Jewish groups became active starting in 1860 when Ashkenazi Jews from central and Eastern Europe unified with Spanish-descent Sephardic Jews to establish the Hebrew Orphan Asylum of New York following common concerns with Catholic proselytizing.

After 1870, placing out children to homes (later known as "foster care") instead of institutions was popularized by Charles Loring Bryce as an alternative to caring for children. By 1910, more than 1,000 orphanages housed two-thirds of children outside their homes, which translates to roughly 3% of the national children's population based on figures from a 1910 census of minors under the age of fifteen. The remaining percentage were either placed in private homes or were beneficiaries of agreements similar to foster care. The Social Security Act of 1935 further improved conditions by authorizing Aid to Families with Dependent Children as a form of social security. Most orphanages closed down after the 1930s, replaced by foster care. Those that remained shifted their attention away from families in poverty to those in severe emotional or psychological distress.

=== The Panic of 1893 ===
The Panic of 1893 was a nationwide depression that stretched into 1896, and according to Vivek Singh it unleashed widespread economic devastation across the country (as well as Canada and parts of Europe). It caused massive poverty and destitution until recovery arrived in 1897. Millions of Americans lost their jobs, severely straining local charities and the societal fabric. This crisis sharply highlighted existing, deep-seated social inequalities and vulnerabilities within the nation. The federal government provided no relief. Agrarian and Populist proposals to flood the economy with silver money were rejected by the cities, where workers feared prices would soar. In the face of growing hardship, charitable organizations and mutual aid societies mobilized to provide relief. This organized response to poverty reflects the social conscience prevalent at the time, but it also exposed the complex and often contradictory nature of late 19th-century charitable movements.

=== From hobo to homeless ===
The "hobo" emerged in the 1880-1933 era as a counterculture forged by very poor transient men; at first many were Civil War veterans. So-called "hobohemia" camps embodied a lifestyle that quite distinct from traditional family life and celebrated an unfettered masculinity and a particular ideal of freedom on the road. They were noted for hopping on railroad cars for free travel between cities, living in ramshackle camps, and working at odd jobs from time to time. In the mid 20th century the hobo culture disappeared and the "homelessness" question emerged. Scholars distinguish between the hobo (who works and wanders) from the "tramp" (who drinks and wanders) and the "bum" (who just drinks).

== African American homelessness ==
According to historian Roberta Ann Johnson, American slavery in the Southern colonies led to homelessness for free Blacks. Runaway slaves represented an early example of American homelessness. Native Americans sometimes provided a safe haven for runaway slaves. During the Civil War (1861-1865), many slaves escaped and became homeless. The Union Army provided protection and some aid and employment to these refugees. During the Reconstruction era after the war large-scale operations by Freedmen's Bureau provided employment for many homeless until it closed in 1872. Most former slaves became tenant farmers, sharecroppers or day laborers on cotton or tobacco farms. In the Great Migration after 1914 many Southern Blacks moved to large Northern cities, and some became homeless in segregated neighborhoods; Large-scale unemployment in the Great Depression of the 1930s disproportionately affected Black Americans. They received federal aid in proportion to their numbers, but it was not proportionate to their needs. The New Deal operated a major farm program, but it helped owners more than tenants, many of whom became homeless. After 1965 urban renewal reduced the number of affordable housing units available to Blacks, forcing them to double up in housing units in the remaining slum areas.

== Appalachia ==
The five mountainous subregions of Appalachia stretch over 200,000 square miles from upstate New York to northern Alabama. From the 1850s onward visiting journalists portrayed a strange subculture characterized by remoteness, poverty and violent feuds. Timber was a valuable resource in the late 19th century; it was shipped out by river. Coal mining became a major industry in Pennsylvania and reached further south as the new railroads criss-crossed the region. The locals sold their timber and mineral rights for 50 cents an acre and did not obtain much of the new wealth. By the 1930s the traditional mountain folk were ridiculed in over 900 newspapers every day as poverty-stricken hillbillies, typified by Li'l Abner and Barney Google and Snuffy Smith. Family ties were all-important, and feuds between family clans lasted for decades and could lead to murder, most famously in the Hatfield–McCoy feud. The idea of clans working together to improve the community could be vetoed when one clan feared the improvements would help their enemies. In 1965 Appalachia became a major target of President Lyndon Johnson's War on Poverty through the new Appalachian Regional Commission. It included 423 counties with 25 million people. Overall, 70% of the counties were high-poverty in 1960, compared to 22% in 2015. However in the 21st century the timber and coal industries have mostly faded away, and millions of locals have emigrated out. Poverty remains a major problem in some areas.

== Progressive era 1890s-1920s ==
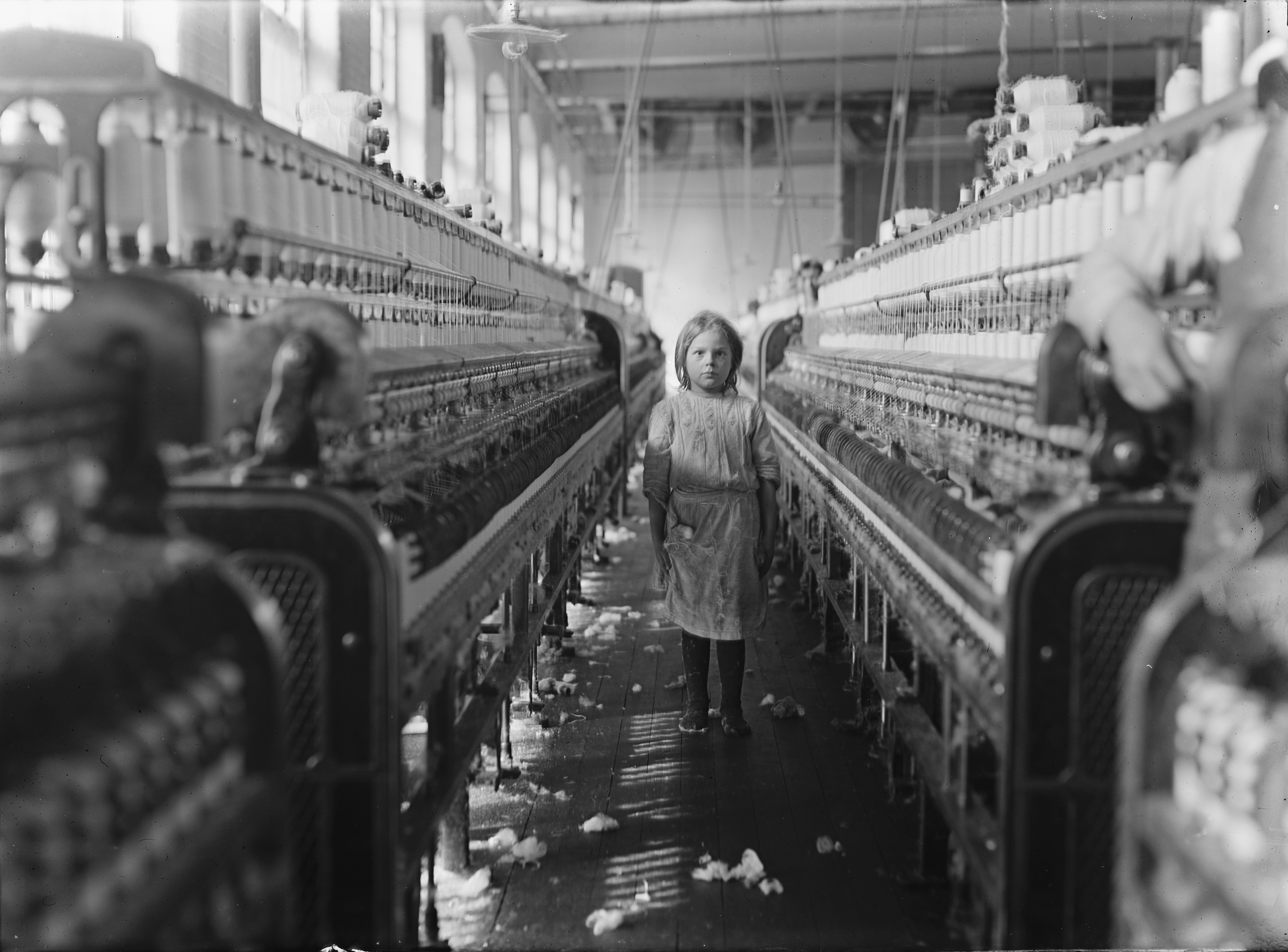
Muckraking photographs by Lewis Hine of children at work mobilized public support for laws raising the minimum age for employment.

Progressive era reformers 1890s to 1920s reoriented the issue of poverty and its cures to combat poverty through systematic sociological research. Catalyzed by Henry George's 1873 book Progress and Poverty, public interest became concerned in how poverty could persist even in a time of economic progress Reformers rejected the outmoded laissez-faire approach and called for action through local government and private philanthropy. The rhetoric shifted from "relief" for the poor to more general "welfare" for everyone. Their rhetoric shifted the spotlight from the unemployed father to the impoverished children. Reformers emphasized publicity, and had support from the newspapers and from private welfare organizations. The first round of success came with raising the Legal working age to reduce Child labor.

Neighborhoods in Chicago color-coded by income, published in Hull House Maps and Papers.

The scientific social survey began with the publication of Hull House Maps and Papers in 1895. This study included essays and maps collected by Florence Kelley and reformers working at Hull House and at the United States Bureau of Labor. Hull House focused on studying the conditions of the slums in Chicago, including four maps color-coded by nationality and income level. Another social reformer, Jacob Riis, documented the living conditions of New York tenements and slums in his 1890 work How the Other Half Lives. It motivated urban reformers.

By the 1920s the National Conference of Charities and Correction and the National Consumers League were enacting workmen's compensation and mothers' aid. Local governments set up Juvenile courts and dedicated social service agencies.

=== Hookworm: eradicating the "germ of laziness" in the South ===
Hookworm was a major disease that was widespread throughout warm, wet regions of the rural South by 1900, affecting a majority of the poor farmers. Hookworms get into the intestines and eat the best food. The loss of essential nutrition leaves the victim tired, distracted and listless. Their productivity sharply declines and that worsened their poverty. Scientific research identified the hookworm's life cycle, and dubbed it the "germ of laziness." Humans became infected through their toes by walking barefoot in areas where people often defecated. With 40% of school children already infected, grassy areas around schools that lacked outhouses were transmission points. The spread can be controlled through the use of outhouses and shoes—but those were uncommon in very poor areas. By 1910 a treatment was found: the patients drank a special chemical that loosened the hookworm's grip. Then they took a heavy dose of laxatives that washed the worms out. When most residents in a locality get treated then the spreading stops and the disease fades away locally. The Rockefeller Foundation funded state health departments which set out successfully to eradicate the disease across the South during the 1910s.

=== Old age ===
The 1920s brought significant challenges for older blue collar workers. The decade was characterized by a massive surge in machinery that displaced traditional manual crafts. The older men had outdated skills that were no longer needed. Furthermore hiring at major companies was handled not by foremen but by central employment offices. As the economy advanced, employment offices began prioritizing speed and agility over long-term experience and seasoned judgment. Management increasingly viewed senior employees as less productive and a source of added liabilities due to the costs associated with insurance, medical, and pension plans. Consequently, many firms—especially in utilities and transportation where pension plans were common—established hiring and employment age limits; they put in flat rules not to hire a new person over age 45 or 50. The result was a higher rate of unemployment among older workers who, once dismissed, faced extreme difficulty securing new positions. Without a job and with no social security they relied on savings and perhaps a small pension. Many relied on wives and children for help in avoiding poverty.

== Great Depression: 1929–1939 ==
During the Great Depression in the United States, the government did not provide any unemployment insurance until Social Security began in 1935, so people who lost jobs easily became impoverished.

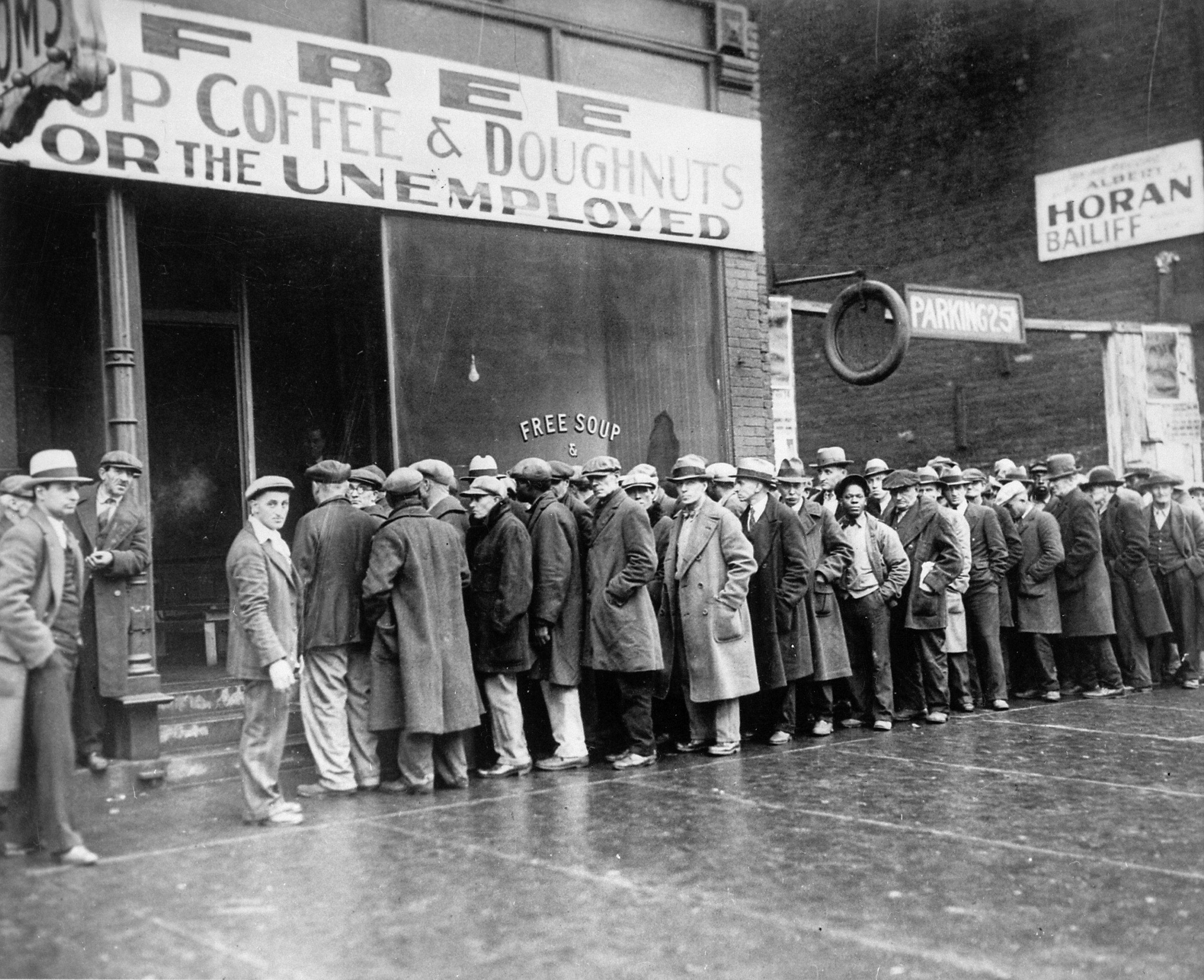
Unemployed men outside a soup kitchen in Depression-era Chicago, 1931

=== 1930s: Great Depression and New Deal ===
Unemployment rate 1910 to 1960

The Great Depression of 1929-1939 caused a devastating epidemic of poverty, hunger, and homelessness for one to two million people at any one time, with a great deal of turnover. As local charities and cities were overwhelmed, the homeless created self-governed shantytowns known as "Hoovervilles." Built from scrap materials in vacant lots near railroad yards, these poverty-stricken settlements housed hundreds or even thousands of displaced young men, with some women and children. Residents lived in makeshift shacks and begged for food or went to soup kitchens run by charities and churches. Local authorities did not officially recognize these Hoovervilles, but they were tolerated out of necessity. By early 1933 about 1.5 million people were lacking shelter. Because state laws denied aid to non-residents, the New Deal under President Franklin Roosevelt created the "Federal Transient Program" (FTP) in May 1933 as part of the new Federal Emergency Relief Administration (FERA), run by Harry Hopkins. FTP covered 100% of the local government costs for helping "transients" (those living in a state for less than a year). At its peak, the FTP operated over 600 facilities, providing food, medical care, housing and some jobs to about 1 million people. Most of those served were young, white, native-born working-class men, though women and African Americans were also present. By 1935, the federal government began phasing out direct relief like the FTP in favor of the "Second New Deal". Several factors drove this change. The FTP was so successful at clearing the streets that public urgency regarding homelessness faded. Officials like Harry Hopkins feared direct relief created "dependency" and pulled men away from traditional roles as family breadwinners. The new policy shifted toward public works run by the WPA and long-term social safety nets especially Social Security. Shutting down the FTP in 1935 caused a resurgence of "hobo" life and left Dust Bowl migrants—like those famously depicted in the 1939 novel and 1940 film The Grapes of Wrath—with little federal support. Finally, the homelessness crisis ended between 1939 and 1941, when the booming World War II defense industries hired as many people as fast as possible.

Federal Emergency Relief Administration specifically focused on creating jobs for alleviating poverty. Jobs were more expensive than direct cash payments (called "the dole"), but were psychologically more beneficial to the unemployed, who wanted any sort of job for morale. The main jobs agency was the Works Progress Administration (WPA). Others included the Civilian Conservation Corps and Public Works Administration. Additionally, the institution of Social Security was one of the largest factors that helped to reduce poverty immediately for old people.

==== Old age support in transition: OASI and OAS ====
"Old-Age and Survivors Insurance" (OASI) was the new Social Security system. It was national in operation --state government had no role. The money came from a new payroll tax paid by workers and by employers. It required participation for several years before monthly benefits were available to the retiree, and payments to surviving spouses. Benefits were determined by formulas based on payroll taxes paid in, and were given whether or not the old person or survivor was needy. To cover the transition a temporary old age relief program Old Age Assistance (OAS) was set up for needy of people. It was funded by federal revenue and administered by each state

==== Agricultural and domestic workers excluded; minorities hurt ====
When Social Security was first created in 1935, it exempted agricultural and domestic workers because of the enormous difficulty of adding many millions of small employers. Racism was not a cause, but the exclusion disproportionately hurt African Americans and Hispanics. Consequently, the savings of retired or disabled African Americans were spent during old age instead of being handed down and households had to support poor elderly family members.

The Home Owners' Loan Corporation, which helped homeowners during the Great Depression gave African American neighborhoods the lowest rating, because they defaulted at greater rates than White Americans. The Federal Housing Authority (FHA) and Veteran's Administration (VA) shut out African Americans by giving loans to suburbs instead of central cities when they were first founded.

== 1940s to 2020s ==
A number of factors helped President Lyndon Johnson launch the national War on Poverty in the 1960s. In 1962, Michael Harrington's book The Other America helped increase public debate and awareness of the poverty issue. The War on Poverty embraced expanding the federal government's roles in education and health care as poverty reduction strategies, and many of its programs were administered by the newly established Office of Economic Opportunity. The War on Poverty coincided with more methodological and precise statistical versions of studying poverty; the "official" U.S. statistical measure of poverty was first adopted in 1969.

After 1945 politicians and the public during the unexpectedly prosperous years gave little attention to poverty. However, social scientists were studying poverty in the midst of plenty. Their work provided the intellectual foundation for Lyndon Johnson's War on Poverty in 1964-1968. They were divided into three schools of thought. First the theoretical economists led by Paul Samuelson and James Tobin following the aggregationist approach of Keynesian economics were confident the economy would continue to grow its productive capacity, and that Washington could be trusted to handle the macroeconomy without specialized new programs. They argued that economic expansion would naturally offer greater opportunities, thereby reducing poverty in an absolute sense and mitigating class conflict. Secondly were the structuralists inspired by Gunnar Myrdal and led by John Kenneth Galbraith. They identified persistent structural limits within the booming economy that left certain groups behind. These limitations were attributed to factors such as race, geography (e.g., "depressed areas" like Appalachia), and vocational skills deficits. They recommended targeted interventions like job training, racial integration, regional economic development, and income redistribution via social welfare spending and progressive taxation. They put forward the Job Corps to provide vocational training and job skills. They also promoted the Appalachian Regional Commission to hit the nation's worst concentration of poverty. to reduce racial discrimination they called for Equal Employment Opportunity Commission (EEOC) and stronger civil rights legislation. Thirdly, the "culture of poverty" approach led by Oscar Lewis and popularized by Michael Harrington's The Other America (1962) argued that persistent poverty had generated a set of attitudes and behaviors that rendered poor individuals culturally incompatible with norms demanded by the mainstream American society and economy. The hoped to change this at young ages with Head Start. Meanwhile outside of academe conservative activists viewed poverty as a result of moralistic failures, recalling the old 19th century individualist notion of poverty as caused by poor character or moral shortcomings. This conservative approach influenced Congress and it scored well in Gallup Polls that indicated an equal division in public opinion between individual guilt and external forces as the cause of poverty.

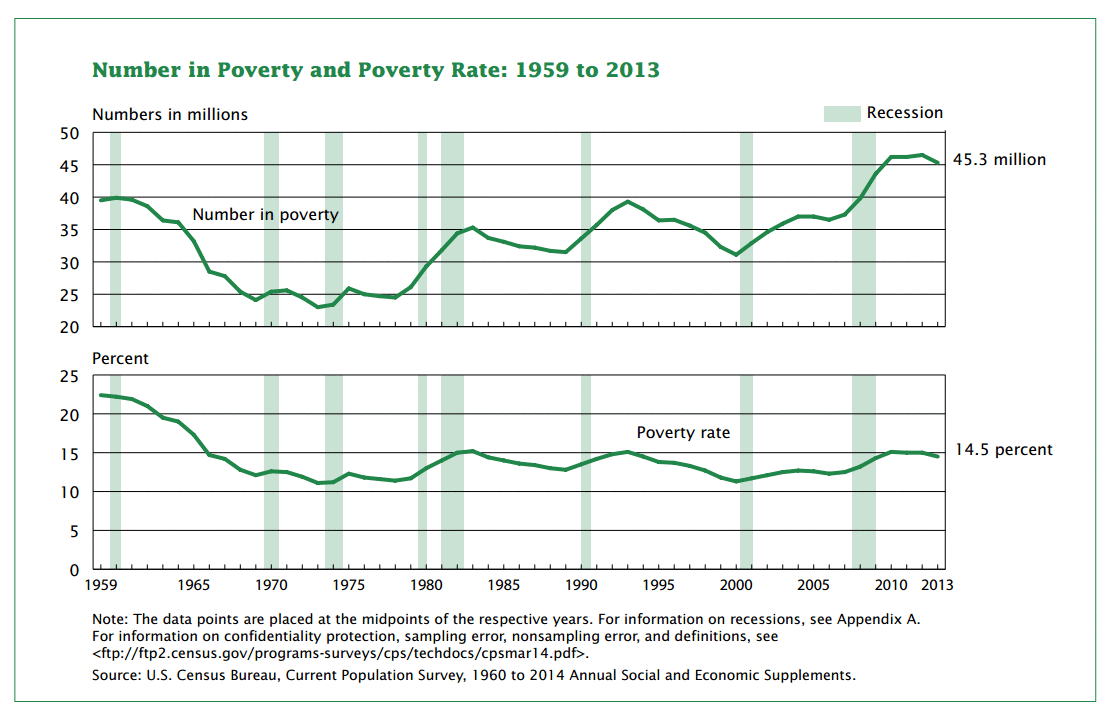
U.S. official poverty trends

=== War on Poverty in 1960s ===
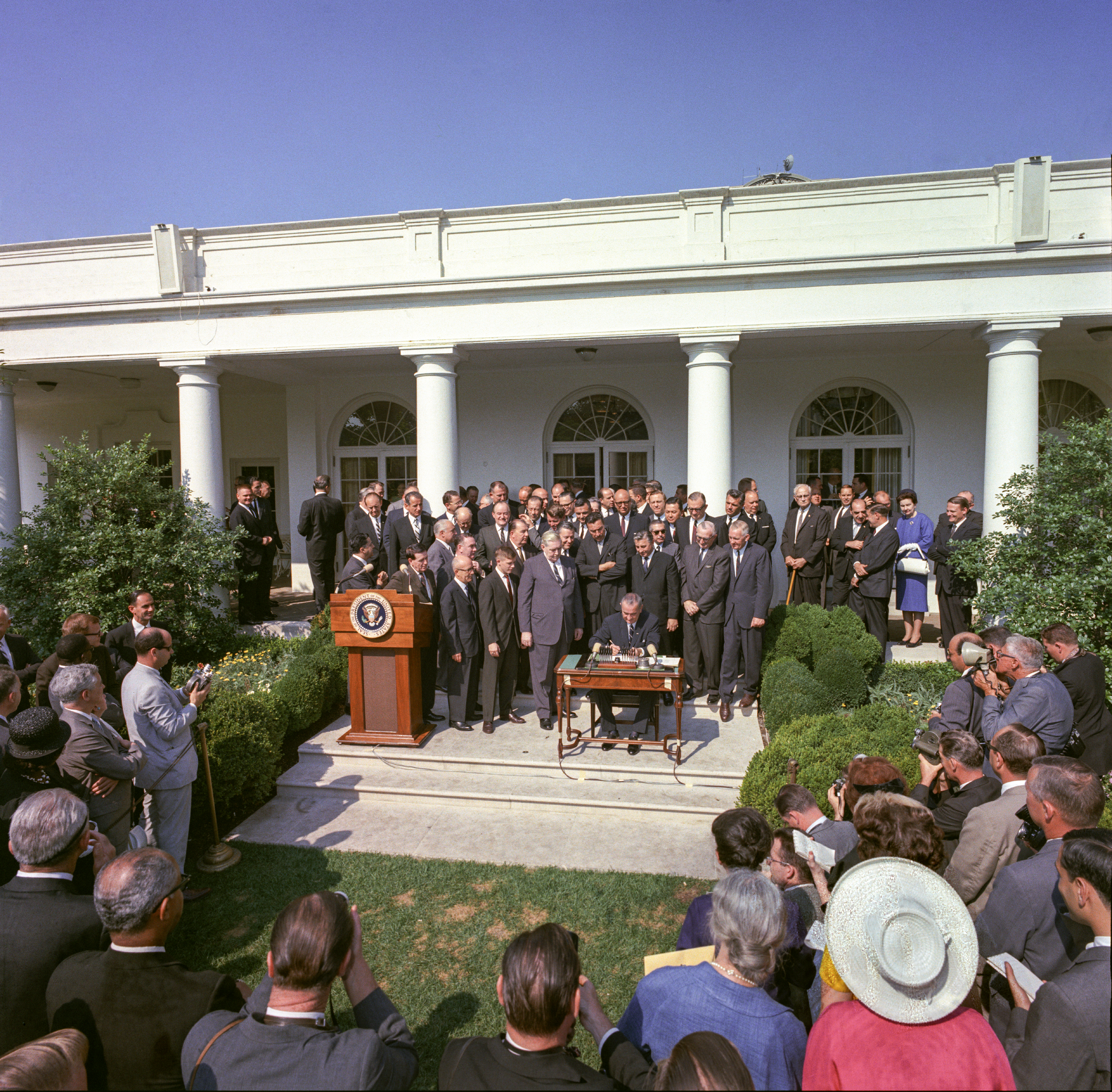
President Lyndon B. Johnson signed the Poverty Bill (also known as the Economic Opportunity Act) while press and supporters of the bill looked on, August 20, 1964.

The War on Poverty is the unofficial name for legislation first introduced by Lyndon B. Johnson in 1964. This legislation was designed to lower the national poverty rate of nineteen percent. Congress passed the Economic Opportunity Act, which established the Office of Economic Opportunity (OEO) to administer the local application of federal funds targeted against poverty. The forty programs established by the Act were collectively aimed at eliminating poverty by improving living conditions for residents of low-income neighborhoods and by helping the poor access economic opportunities long denied from them.

As a part of the Great Society, Johnson believed in expanding the federal government's roles in education and health care as poverty reduction strategies. These policies can also be seen as a continuation of Franklin D. Roosevelt's New Deal, which ran from 1933 to 1937, and Roosevelt's Four Freedoms of 1941. Prior to President John F. Kennedy's assassination in November 1963, Kennedy planned on proposing anti-poverty legislation in the 1964 State of the Union address that Johnson ended up giving. Johnson stated, "Our aim is not only to relieve the symptom of poverty, but to cure it and, above all, to prevent it".

The War on Poverty was heavily criticized by conservatives and has been treated as an "idealistic touchstone" by liberals for decades, although some liberals felt that the War on Poverty did not go far enough with its reforms. Deregulation, growing criticism of the welfare state, and an ideological shift to reducing federal aid to impoverished people in the 1980s and 1990s culminated in the Personal Responsibility and Work Opportunity Act of 1996, which President Bill Clinton claimed "ended welfare as we know it". The legacy of the War on Poverty policy initiative remains in the continued existence of such federal government programs as Head Start, Volunteers in Service to America (VISTA), TRiO, and Job Corps.

The official poverty rate has fallen from 19.5% in 1963 to 10.5% in 2019 while other measures of poverty show that the poverty rate fell from 19.5% to 1.6%. In 2021 the official poverty rate was 11.6% and Supplemental Poverty Measure (SPM) was 7.8%, the latter which increased to 12.4% in 2022 due to the end of pandemic aid.

=== 1996: Ending welfare as we know it ===
Democratic President Bill Clinton, elected in 1992 and reelected in 1996, confronted public opinion that was deeply suspicious of the welfare programs. Polls indicated large majorities distrusted the traditional federal welfare programs as honeycombed with dishonesty and inefficiency. Clinton famously promised to "end welfare as we know it." Conservative Republicans under Newt Gingrich won strong landslides in the midterm elections of 1994, and the resulting welfare policy reforms of 1996, officially known as the Personal Responsibility and Work Opportunity Reconciliation Act (PRWORA), was largely drafted by Republicans; liberal Democrats were deeply disappointed when Clinton signed it into law.. It marked a historic shift in American social policy, replacing the entitlement system with a model centered on work, time limits, and state control.

The new central policy was that welfare should be a temporary "second chance" rather than a permanent way of life. For the first time, most able-bodied recipients were required to work or participate in job training within two years of receiving benefits. A lifetime limit of five years was placed on federal cash assistance. The policy prioritized immediate job placement over long-term education or vocational training, under the belief that any job was a stepping stone to self-sufficiency. The reform ended the federal "entitlement" status of welfare. Previously, under Aid to Families with Dependent Children (AFDC), the federal government matched state spending with no cap. Now AFDC was replaced by Temporary Assistance for Needy Families (TANF). The federal government now provided states with a fixed "block grant" of money and they were given broad authority to design their own programs, set eligibility rules, and decide how to spend the funds. The law included explicit social goals intended to influence family structure and reduce "dependency." The reform aimed to reduce out-of-wedlock pregnancies and encouraged the formation of two-parent households. Unmarried minor parents were required to live with a responsible adult and stay in school to remain eligible for benefits. The law introduced aggressive new measures to track deadbeat parents and enforce child support payments, including the ability to revoke driver’s licenses for non-compliance. Non-citizens were initially barred from receiving SSI (Supplemental Security Income) and Food Stamps.

=== 1939 to 2023 ===
Burkhauser and Corinth (2026) used a wider range of data to construct poverty trends before and after the "War on Poverty" programs of 1964. Their data shows that from 1939 to 1963, for all families poverty fell by 29 percentage points overall. The drop was driven primarily by increases in market income rather than government assistance. Only 2% to 3% of working-age adults relied on government transfers for at least half their income. After 1964 poverty declined at about the same annual rate as before. Dependency on government transfers rose from 7% in 1972 to 15% in 2023. The poverty rate among Black families fell from 84% in 1939 to 51% in 1963 and 6% in 2023.

== See also ==
- African-American family structure § Poverty, in 21st century
  - Racial inequality in the United States
- Appalachia
  - Social and economic stratification in Appalachia
- Disability in the United States
  - Timeline of disability rights in the United States
- History of health care reform in the United States
- History of public health in the United States
- History of poverty in the United Kingdom
- Homelessness in the United States
- Poor White, a major social class in the South
- Poverty in the United States, for current details
- Poverty in Canada
- Social programs in the United States
- Skid row, impoverished neighborhood in a city
- The Negro Family: The Case For National Action, 1965 Moynihan Report
- Women in America: Indicators of Social and Economic Well-Being
