= Women in America: Indicators of Social and Economic Well-Being =

Women in America: Indicators of Social and Economic Well-Being is a report issued in 2011 by the United States Department of Commerce Economics and Statistics Administration and the Executive Office of the President Office of Management and Budget for the White House Council on Women and Girls, during the administration of President Barack Obama. The report, which pulls together data from federal sources to give a "snapshot" of the well-being of American women, was released in March in observance of Women's History Month.

== Background ==
This was the first such report since The Presidential Report on American Women issued in 1963 by a commission headed by Eleanor Roosevelt under President John F. Kennedy. More than 30 people from about 6 government agencies provided the data and contributed to the report.

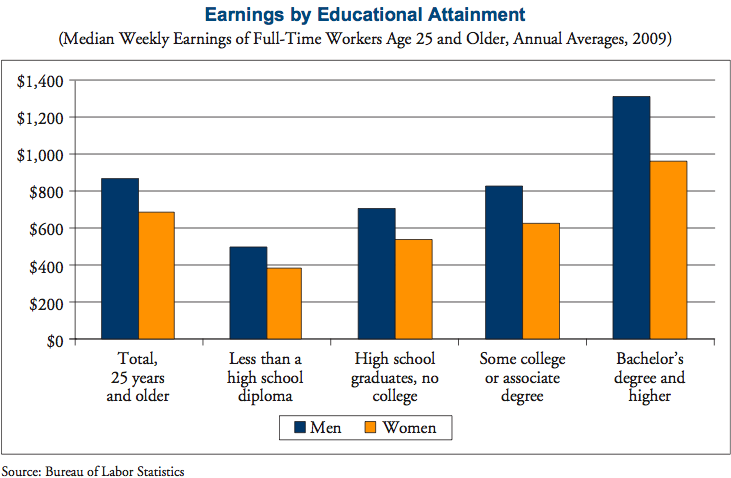
Women have excelled in education but their earnings are 75% of their male counterparts.

"I think it will inform a wide variety of different policy in programs that the federal government will either initiate or continue but it will be evidence-based," Valerie Jarrett, a senior advisor to President Obama who is chair of the White House Council on Women and Children, said in a conference phone call announcing the report's publication.

=== Press summaries ===
The Wall Street Journal summarized the report: "women have met, and in some cases surpassed, men in educational achievement but still lag in pay and are more likely to be in poverty". Reuters said, "More women than men have a high school education, more have university degrees, and more have graduate degrees, but at all levels of education, women earn about 75 percent as much as their male counterparts".

== Contents ==
The report has five main sections divided into major points (listed below) each with an accompanying chart. According to the foreword, women have made "enormous progress" in education. Young women are now more likely than young men to earn a college or a master's degree. The number of employed women and men has become nearly equal in recent years. In income and employment, women are more likely to be in poverty than men, and women of color are more likely to be in poverty than others. In health, men suffer from heart disease and diabetes more than women do. Women suffer from mobility impairments, arthritis, asthma, depression, and obesity more than men do. In crime, women are less likely to be the target of violent crimes than in the past but they are more likely than men to be the victims of intimate partner violence and stalking.

=== People, families, and income ===
1. While the populations of both men and women are aging, women continue to outnumber men at older ages.
2. Both women and men are delaying marriage.
3. Fewer women are married than in the past.
4. More women than in the past have never had a child.
5. Women are giving birth to their first child at older ages.
6. Women are having fewer children.
7. Most adults live in households headed by married couples; single-mother households are more common than single-father households.
8. Women are more likely than men to be in poverty. More women than men have lived below the poverty line consistently since 1966.

=== Education ===
1. Women’s gains in educational attainment have significantly out paced those of men over the last 40 years.
2. Female students score higher than males on reading assessments and lower than males on mathematics assessments.
3. Higher percentages of women than men age 25–34 have earned a college degree.
4. More women than men have received a graduate education.
5. Women earn the majority of conferred degrees overall but earn fewer degrees than men in science and technology.
6. Higher percentages of women than men participate in adult education.

=== Employment ===
1. After decades of significant increases, the labor force participation rate for women has held steady in recent years.
2. Unemployment rates for women have risen less than for men in recent recessions.
3. More women than men work part-time, and women and men have roughly equal access to flexible work schedules.
4. Education pays for both women and men, but the pay gap persists.
5. Women and men continue to work in different occupations.
6. Female-headed families have the lowest family earnings among all family types.
7. In families where both husband and wife are employed, employed wives spend more time in household activities than do employed husbands.
8. Women are more likely than men to do volunteer work.

=== Health ===
1. Women have longer life expectancy than men, but the gap is decreasing.
2. Women are almost 40 percent more likely than men to report difficulty walking.
3. More women than men report having a chronic medical condition.
4. Females age 12 and older are more likely than males to report experiencing depression.
5. More than one-third of all women age 20 and older are obese.
6. Less than half of all women meet the Federal physical activity guidelines for aerobic activity.
7. In 2008, the cesarean rate was the highest ever reported in the United States.
8. Many women do not receive specific recommended preventive care.
9. The share of women age 18–64 without health insurance has increased.
10. One out of seven women age 18–64 has no usual source of health care.

=== Crime and violence ===
1. Nonfatal violent crimes against women declined between 1993 and 2008.
2. Homicides of females declined between 1993 and 2008.
3. Nonfatal attacks on women by intimate partners declined between 1994 and 2008.
4. Reported rape rates declined during the 1990s and have remained stable in recent years.
5. Women are at greater risk than men for stalking victimization.
6. Females account for a small but growing share of persons arrested for violent crimes other than homicide.
7. Females are convicted more frequently for property crimes than for violent crimes.
8. The imprisonment rate for females has increased significantly.

== See also ==
- Poverty in the United States
- History of poverty in the United States
