= Edwin E. Witte =

American economist

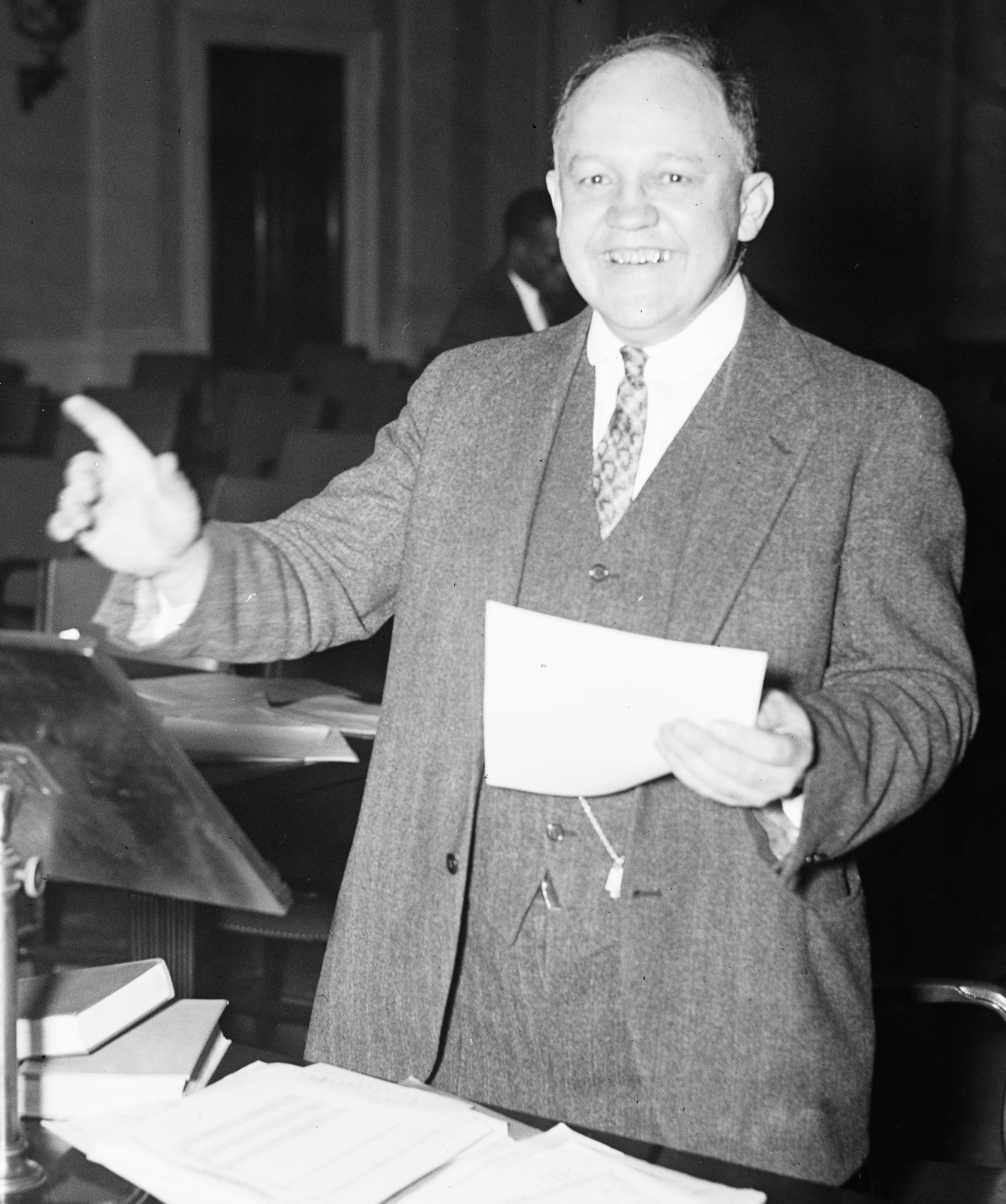
Witte explaining a proposal, 1935

Edwin Emil Witte (January 4, 1887 – May 20, 1960) was an American economist who focused on social insurance issues for the state of Wisconsin and for the Committee on Economic Security. While the executive director of the President's Committee on Economic Security under U.S. President Franklin D. Roosevelt, he developed during 1934 the policies and the legislation that became the Social Security Act of 1935. Because of this he is sometimes called "the father of Social Security".

== Education and family life ==
Witte was born in the Moravian community of Ebenezer, Wisconsin, about four miles south of Watertown. He was recognized from an early age as having remarkable intelligence, such that his parents sent him to high school in Watertown. He graduated as the valedictorian of his class and also became the first person in his family to attend college.

He graduated from the University of Wisconsin in 1909 with a B.A. in history and immediately began graduate work. His adviser, Frederick Jackson Turner, left Madison in 1910 for Harvard, but recommended that Witte continue studying history under John R. Commons of the economics department. This advice turned Witte to the study of economics. Because Commons at this time was heavily involved in advising Robert M. La Follette, and the government of Wisconsin (see Wisconsin Idea), Witte easily found work with the state upon completion of his coursework in 1911. Witte was soon overwhelmed with work; he completed his qualifying exams in 1916 but did not return to his dissertation studies until the mid-1920s. He eventually completed his doctorate in economics in 1927.

Witte married Florence Rimsnider, a librarian who worked at the Legislative Reference Library. The couple lived on Madison Street; they had one son and two daughters.

== As government social reformer ==
Witte's first job for the state of Wisconsin was as a statistician of workmen's compensation insurance rates for the Wisconsin Industrial Commission. His work here led the Wisconsin Legislature to grant the Commission authority to regulate those rates.

In 1912, Witte accepted the job of personal secretary to Congressman John M. Nelson. Nelson served on the House Judiciary Committee which was then considering the Clayton Antitrust Act. Witte wrote Nelson's minority report opposing approval of the Clayton Act because its language did not provide a strong anti-injunction clause favored by Samuel Gompers and organized labor. Witte's views were validated in Duplex Printing Press Company v. Deering (254 U.S. 443 [1921]) which struck down the labor protection clauses of the act.

When Commons was appointed to the United States Commission on Industrial Relations, he brought Witte along. Witte's main focus here was on the use of the labor injunction, which became the topic of his dissertation. By the time he published this research, he was noted as the foremost authority on the anti-labor injunction and served as an adviser (along with Felix Frankfurter, Donald Richberg, Francis Sayre, and Herman Oliphant) to the Senate Judiciary Committee drafting the Norris-La Guardia Anti-Injunction Act of 1932.

In January 1917, he was appointed the executive secretary of the Wisconsin Industrial Commission., where he added labor and safety regulatory policies to his list of progressive social insurance concerns. In 1921, he accepted the position of chief of the Wisconsin Legislative Research Library a position that was mostly helping legislators draft legislation.

In all of these positions, Witte developed his skills at using research as a tool for persuasion in the development of social insurance policy. Working closely with legislators at both the state and national level, Witte had a keen sense for the process. As a government social reformer, David B. Johnson describe Witte as "neither a politician nor an activist. Rather he was a facilitator, a creative draftsman of public programs, a compromiser, and a tireless mediator who devoted his efforts towards bringing divergent sides together and to working out mutually acceptable solutions".

== Professor at the University of Wisconsin ==
From 1922 to 1933, he served as chief of the Wisconsin Legislative Reference Library, an agency now known as the Wisconsin Legislative Reference Bureau. Joining the faculty at Wisconsin, he worked with Commons, and Selig Perlman, Robert M. La Follette, Sr., Robert M. La Follette, Jr., E. A. Ross, and Arthur J. Altmeyer (who became the chairman of the Social Security Board) who were developing the Wisconsin progressive movement and working on public policy issues of the day. In 1933 Witte was appointed full professor in the economics department at the University of Wisconsin-Madison. Throughout the 1910s and 1920s, while serving as an administrator, Witte managed to publish consistently. This, coupled with his reputation as an expert on labor economics explain the unusual appointment. Following this appointment, Witte served on the unemployment insurance section of the Wisconsin Industrial Commission.

As a professor of economics, one of his central beliefs (taught in his "Government and Business" courses) was that the economics discipline, because of its focus on markets, deprecated the role of government in regulating, promoting, and protecting the economy. He preferred "political economics" to "economics" as the truer descriptor of his discipline. Also trained by Commons, Witte preferred the institutional economics approach to problems.

== Social Security ==
Because of Witte's expertise in both legislation and social insurance, and his national reputation as an expert in the area of social insurance, he was selected to lead the President's Committee on Economic Security to propose legislation that would eventually become the Social Security Act of 1935. Witte also was an acquaintance of Secretary of Labor Frances Perkins, and her assistant secretary, Arthur J. Altmeyer was a colleague of Witte's while at graduate school and on the Wisconsin Industrial Commission.

The major problem facing Witte was time. He was appointed in late July and President Roosevelt wanted legislative proposals to hand the new congress when it convened in January 1935. Witte was able to meet this deadline. He and his staff (which included one of his undergraduate students Wilbur J. Cohen) had a set of legislative proposals that covered unemployment insurance, old-age pensions, disability compensation, aid to families with dependent children. His committee also for a time worked on a national health insurance plan but this was dropped from the final bill as being too much too soon. It was also strongly opposed by the American Medical Association.

When hearings began in January 1935, Witte as the principal author of the Social Security Act of 1935 was questioned for four days before the House Ways and Means Committee explaining the operation of the bill, its costs and benefits, and using his research to make a persuasive case. He performed the same act for three days before the Senate Finance Committee. He remained in Washington during the Spring and Summer of 1935, working with Congress towards the final legislation. It was signed by Roosevelt on August 18, 1935. Witte returned to his teaching but remained for many years a consultant to the Social Security Administration as a member of the first Advisory Council on Social Security, as a member of the Federal Advisory Council on Social Security, and as a member of the President's Committee on Administrative Management.

=== Father of social security ===
Witte has long been credited as the "Father of Social Security", but Witte himself denied this claim. He believed that he deserved "this title less than many others". Witte pointed out that the Social Security Act was a collaborative undertaking:

Social Security, like most other major social advances, has been the product of the endeavors and work of many people over a long period of time. The contributions made by any one person have been so commingled with those of many others that the end-product cannot be attributed to any individual or group of individuals.

Then, also, Arthur J. Altmeyer is often referred to as the "Father of Social Security". See the remarks of Congressman Robert Kastenmeier (D-WI) on the death of Altmeyer.

The son of Abraham Epstein has called his father the "Forgotten Father of Social Security" in a recent book.

== Later life ==
Witte continued to advise legislators both in Wisconsin and Washington for many years afterwards. In 1935, he consulted with Senators Robert M. La Follette, Jr. and Robert Wagner on the Wagner Act (National Labor Relations Act). In addition to guiding the Social Security Act through the United States Congress, Witte also worked on other labor legislation including (with George William Norris and Fiorello H. La Guardia) the Norris La Guardia anti-injunction act. Also during the 1930s he served on the Wisconsin State Planning Board and the Wisconsin Labor Relations Board. He continued to teach and publish as well. During his tenure at the University of Wisconsin, he advised fifty six Ph.D. candidates. During World War II, Witte served as a labor-management mediator under the Defense Mobilization Act and then for the War Labor Board. Once the war was over Witte returned to his teaching.

In 1947 he created the Industrial Relations Center at Madison. He was also one of the founding members of the Industrial Relations Research Association and was its first president in 1948. He was also involved with the National Association of Arbiters, the Atomic Energy Labor Relations Panel as well as continuing to advise Wisconsin legislators. During the academic year of 1953–54, he was a visiting scholar at Cornell University's School of Industrial and Labor Relations. In 1956 Witte was elected to the presidency of the American Economics Association.

Witte retired in 1957, and like millions of other Americans, received Social Security benefits, while he continued to teach regularly as a visiting professor. Edwin E. Witte died on May 20, 1960, of a stroke complicated by cardiovascular issues.

== Bibliography ==
- The Government in Labor Disputes (1932)
- Social Security in America (1937)
