= Unified budget =

In the United States a unified budget is a federal government budget in which receipts and outlays from federal funds and the Social Security Trust Fund are consolidated. The change to a unified budget resulted in a single measure of the fiscal status of the government, based on the sum of all government activity. When these fund groups are consolidated to display budget totals, transactions that are outlays of one fund group (i.e., interfund transactions) are deducted to avoid double counting.

== History ==
The United States government adopted a unified budget in the Johnson administration in 1968, beginning with the 1969 budget. The surplus in the Social Security OASDI (Old Age Survivors and Disabilities Insurance) budget offsets the total deficit, making it appear smaller than it otherwise would.

The Budget Enforcement Act of 1990, however changed this so that the two Social Security Trust Funds, and the operations of the Postal Service, are considered to be 'off-budget' and are excluded from the unified budget. This means that the Social Security Tax is not counted as revenue to the General Fund, and interest paid to the Trust Funds is counted as an expense to an external entity. Often Federal budget reports will contain two sets of numbers for the yearly Federal Budget: an 'off-budget' deficit (or surplus) and an 'on-budget' deficit (or surplus) the former of course including the receipts and outlays of these budgets, but by law for purposes of balancing the budget they are 'off-budget'.

== See also ==
- United States budget process
- Social Security (United States)
