= Arthur J. Altmeyer =

American government official (1891–1972)

Arthur Altmeyer
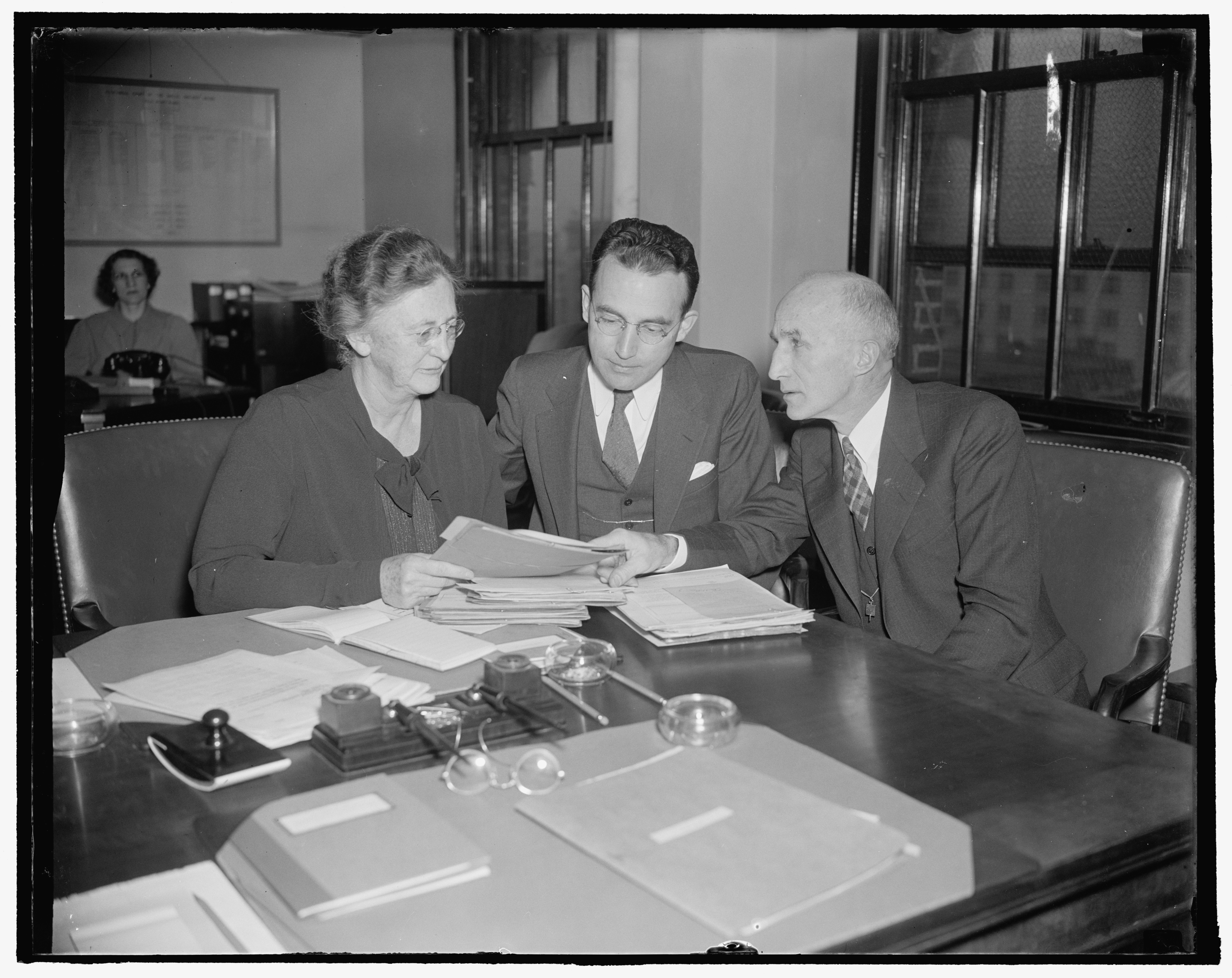
- Altmeyer (center) presiding over an early meeting of the Social Security Board, 1937

1st Commissioner of the Social Security Administration
- In office July 16, 1946 – April 10, 1953
- President: Harry S. Truman; Dwight D. Eisenhower
- Preceded by: Himself (SSB chair)
- Succeeded by: William Mitchell (acting)

Chair of the Social Security Board
- In office February 19, 1937 – July 16, 1946
- President: Franklin D. Roosevelt; Harry S. Truman
- Preceded by: John Winant
- Succeeded by: Himself (SSA Commissioner)
- In office September 30, 1936 – November 16, 1936; Acting
- President: Franklin D. Roosevelt
- Preceded by: John Winant
- Succeeded by: John Winant

Secretary of the Wisconsin Industrial Commission
- In office 1922–1933
- Governor: John J. Blaine; Fred R. Zimmerman; Walter Kohler; Philip La Follette
- Preceded by: Edwin E. Witte
- Succeeded by: Helen Gill

Personal details
- Born: May 8, 1891 De Pere, Wisconsin, U.S.
- Died: October 16, 1972 (aged 81) Madison, Wisconsin, U.S.
- Resting place: Forest Hill Cemetery
- Party: Democratic
- Spouse: Ethel Thomas
- Education: University of Wisconsin, Madison (BA, MA, PhD)

Arthur Joseph Altmeyer (May 8, 1891 – October 16, 1972) was the first United States Commissioner for Social Security from 1946 to 1953, and the second chairman of the Social Security Board from 1937 to 1946. He was a key figure in the design and implementation of the U.S. Social Security system.

== Education ==
Altmeyer was born in De Pere, Wisconsin, on May 8, 1891, and developed an early interest in social security while working as an office boy in his uncle's law office. For a while he was a public school teacher and school principal and also attended the University of Wisconsin-Madison, graduating with a B.A. in 1914. In 1918, he re-entered the University as a graduate student, where he studied with John R. Commons, one of a handful of American economists versed in social insurance who was actively interested in workers' compensation, unemployment insurance and health insurance. Altmeyer became interested in social and labor policies when he learned about Commons' role as the principal author of Wisconsin's workmen's compensation program, which was then the only one in the United States. They and others at Wisconsin were proponents of the progressive, liberal social policy of a positive and vigorous role for government. In 1918, Altmeyer became Commons' graduate research assistant. Together they co-authored a report on "The Health Insurance Movement in the United States" for the Illinois Health Insurance Commission and the Ohio Health and Old Age Insurance Commission. Altmeyer was also working for the Wisconsin State Tax Commission and the Wisconsin Industrial Commission, while working on his M.A. which was granted in 1921, and his PhD in economics, which was granted in 1931.

== Government career ==
Altmeyer became Chief Statistician of the Wisconsin Industrial Commission in 1920 working under Edwin E. Witte. Altmeyer founded a monthly publication, the Wisconsin Labor Market, which was second such publications in the U.S. In 1922, after Witte had moved on, Altmeyer was appointed to his position as Secretary of the Wisconsin Industrial Commission, a position he held, with one interim, until 1932. In this position Altmeyer oversaw Wisconsin's worker's compensation program and developed and implemented the state's unemployment insurance system which was the first of its kind in the U.S. In 1927, he went on leave to assume a temporary federal position in the Great Lakes Region with responsibility for implementing the Longshoremen's and Harbor Workers' Compensation Act.

In Spring, 1933, he was invited to Washington by Labor Secretary Frances Perkins to consult on relations with state labor departments. He advised the Federal Emergency Relief Administration and the Civil Works Administration. In November 1933, he was appointed Director of the Labor Compliance Division of the National Recovery Administration. He returned briefly to Madison in May 1934 but was almost immediately appointed Second Assistant Secretary of Labor.

== Social security ==
In June 1934, Altmeyer, acting upon instructions from President Franklin Delano Roosevelt, Secretary Perkins and Presidential Adviser Harry Hopkins, drafted for the president Executive Order 6757, which provided for creation of a Committee on Economic Security, the committee which oversaw drafting of the bill which became the Social Security Act of 1935. Perkins chaired the committee, and Altmeyer served as technical director. Other figures on the board included Hopkins, Secretary of the Treasury Henry Morgenthau Jr., Attorney General Homer Cummings, and Secretary of Agriculture Henry A. Wallace. The Committee selected as its Executive Director Edwin E. Witte of the Economics Department at the University of Wisconsin and an expert in labor legislation. In 1935, he became a member of the executive committee of the National Youth Administration.

Following passage of the Social Security Act, Altmeyer was appointed to the Social Security Board created by the act. Altmeyer, because of his background, education, and ability soon became the unacknowledged leader of the board. This was confirmed in 1937, when Roosevelt appointed Altmeyer as chairman of the board. Altmeyer hired Wilbur J. Cohen as an aide, and Frank Bane as first executive director of the Social Security Board.

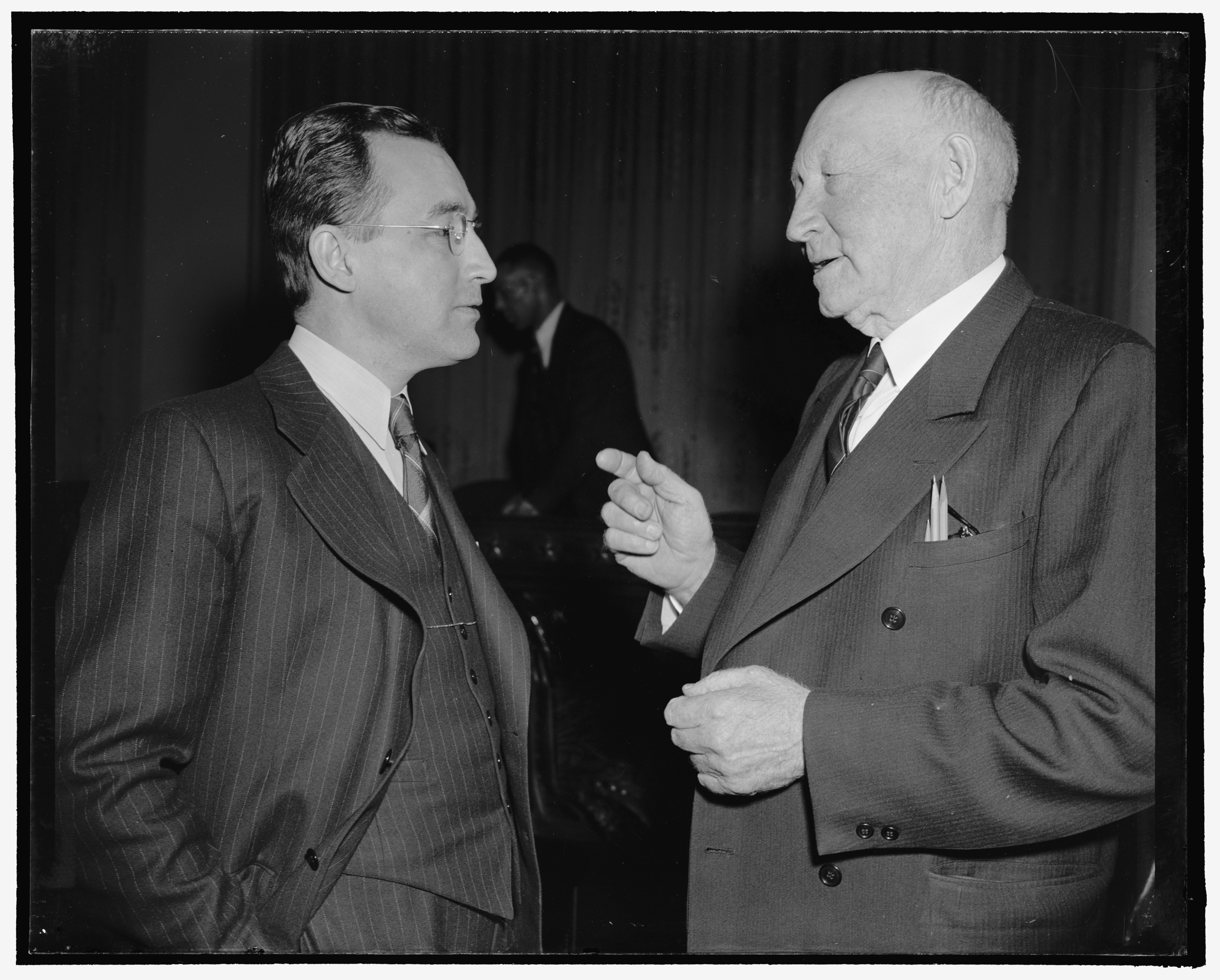
Altmeyer with Rep. Robert L. Doughton — Chairman of United States House Committee on Ways and Means — in 1939.

Altmeyer was the principal advocate for changes to the Social Security Act in 1939. He advocated for broadening the program from a personal retirement program to a family social insurance program, one that protected family dependents in the cases of death or disability and to care for families with dependent children.

Even while emphasizing the efficient and non-partisan administration of the Social Security Administration, Altmeyer continued to speak out for policies that he believed in. This sentence from a speech in 1943 summarizes his view:

I believe that we should be thinking in terms of developing for this country a unified comprehensive system of contributory social insurance which would cover all of the major economic hazards to which the workers of this country are subjected, namely, old age, disability, death, and unemployment.

=== Commissioner for social security ===
Following revisions to the act in 1946 creating the Social Security Administration, Altmeyer was appointed Commissioner for Social Security. Altmeyer was criticized for his policy that the Social Security Administration would help people get benefits they were entitled to. His critics found a law from 1835 saying that no officer of the Federal Government "shall encourage a claim against the federal government".

Altmeyer continued to advocated for expansion of Social Security benefits. In 1950 and 1952, he was able to persuade Congress to include workers not included under the original act. He also fought against Congress's inclination to make the Social Security Administration a place for patronage. These struggles against Congress ultimately led to his termination as Social Security Commissioner in 1953 when his re-appointment was not confirmed by a new Republican-controlled Congress.

== Outside of social security ==
Outside of Social Security, he was involved in implementation of a federal and state civil service merit system and for a policy making federal grants proportional to per capita state income. During World War Two, Altmeyer was the secretary of the War Manpower Commission. Following the war he served as secretary to the International Refugee Organization. As the leading authority on the U.S. social security system, he was also consulted by Latin American nations during the 1940s and 1950s when those nations began developing social security programs of their own.

== Later life ==
In 1953, after Dwight D. Eisenhower became president, the office of commissioner for social security was abolished, in favor of a new office, the commissioner of social security. After public outcry because Altmeyer's job was eliminated a few days before he could retire with benefits, Eisenhower's administration offered him a one-month appointment to a position, but he refused to accept being paid for a non-job.

Altmeyer later served in a variety of United Nations posts, advising other countries on social security and labor issues.

Altmeyer died in Madison on October 16, 1972. After his death, the Social Security Administration renamed the Administration Building at its Baltimore, MD headquarters in his honor.

Under Altmeyer's leadership, the Social Security Board and Social Security Administration developed its actuarial research capabilities within the U.S. government. He managed both the theoretical design of social policy and the logistical operations required to implement it.

Political offices
Preceded by John Winant	Chair of the Social Security Board; Acting; 1936	Succeeded by John Winant
Preceded by John Winant	Chair of the Social Security Board; 1937–1946	Succeeded by Himself as Commissioner of the Social Security Administration
Preceded by Himself as Chair of the Social Security Board	Commissioner of the Social Security Administration; 1946–1953	Succeeded by William Mitchell; Acting
