= Abe Epstein =

Russian-born American lecturer and activist (1892–1942)

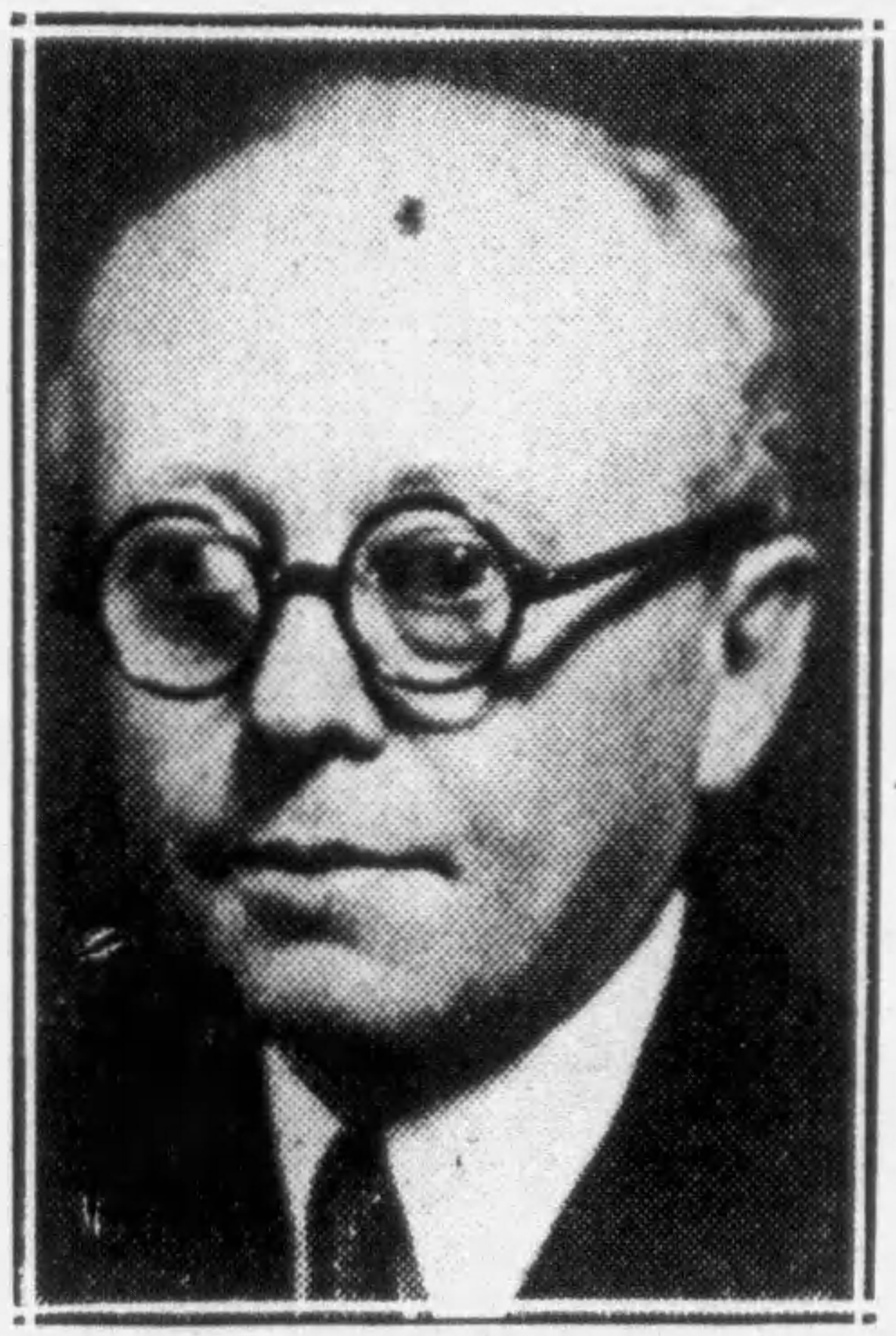
Epstein c. 1935

Abraham Epstein (April 20, 1892 – May 2, 1942) was a Russian-born American lecturer and activist. He championed social security and was a major figure in its enactment into law in the United States.

== Biography ==
Epstein was born on April 20, 1892, in Lyuban, Russian Empire, to Jews Leon and Bessie Levovitz Epstein. He read a lot as a child, including banned socialist authors Karl Marx and Friedrich Engels, which he had access to due to his library being in a rural town. He abandoned home and travelled to Liepāja, and in 1910, he immigrated to the United States; a newspaper later described him at this time as "poor as a mouse in a synagogue". He graduated from the University of Pittsburgh in 1917 and continued his studies at Columbia University until 1931.

In 1918, Epstein joined the Pennsylvania Commission on Old Age Pensions (PCOAP) for six years, and later the Fraternal Order of Eagles. With the PCOAP, he introduced the first social security bill in the United States to the Pennsylvania General Assembly in 1921. He wrote the books Facing Old Age and Insecurity – a Challenge to America, which advocated for social security. Time called him "the strongest single influence in the U.S. on the trend of public opinion toward the adoption of social security legislation".

Epstein argued for social security nonpartisanly and believed that the facts and statistics would change opinions. On July 22, 1927, he established the American Association for Social Security, a social security advocacy group which in 1933, renamed itself to the American Association for Social Security. The group was a figure in the enactment of the Social Security Act in 1935. Though, Epstein disagreed with the law's restrictions and continued to advocate for more social safety nets.

Epstein was also a lecturer at Brooklyn College and New York University.

In an interview with the Los Angeles Times, his son, Pierre, described Epstein as a "little man with a high-pitched voice, heavy accent and thick spectacles". He was married to Henriette Epstein. He died on May 2, 1942, aged 50, in New York City. Since 1985, his papers have been held by the University of Michigan. In his legacy, he has been noted as a forgotten figure.
