= Michael M. Davis =

American politician

Michael M. Davis (1879–1971) was the Executive Chair of the Committee for the Nation's Health Throughout his life he was a major figure in health care policy.

During Harry S. Truman's time as President, Davis kept files and records of Truman's speeches.
