= Veterans' benefits =

Benefits to retired military personnel

The Veterans Benefits Administration (VBA) under the US Department of Veterans Affairs (VA) provides a wide variety of benefits to retired or separated United States armed forces personnel and their dependents or survivors. Through the VA, Veterans can receive educational assistance (GI Bill), healthcare, assisted living, home loans, insurance, and burial and memorial services. The VA also provides compensation to disabled veterans who suffer from a medical disorder or injury that was incurred in, or aggravated by, their military service, and which causes social and occupational impairment. Many U.S. states also offer disability benefits for veterans.

== Types of benefits ==
=== Educational benefits ===
The VA offers several education and career readiness programs including tuition assistance, vocational training, and career counseling. The Post-9/11 Veterans Educational Assistance Act of 2008 (commonly known as the "Post 9/11 GI Bill") provides full tuition and fees at four-year colleges or other qualified educational programs for Veterans who served on active duty for at least 3 years after September 11, 2001. The Personalized Career Planning and Guidance program (VA Chapter 38) provides free educational and career planning for eligible Veterans. The Montgomery GI Bill provides financial assistance for Veterans that have served at least 2 years on active duty.

=== Medical benefits ===
Eligible Veterans can receive VA health care, which covers standard preventative care and treatment services, as well as therapy and rehabilitation services, prosthetic items, and radiation oncology, among other services. Veterans with service-related physical conditions (e.g. chronic illness or injury) or mental health conditions (e.g. PTSD) can also apply for monthly tax-free disability compensation from the VA.

=== Employment benefits ===
The Veteran Readiness and Employment program (VA Chapter 31) offers vocational rehabilitation, training, and other career services for Veterans who have a service-related disability. The Veteran Small Business Certification program provides advantages for Veteran-owned small businesses competing for government contracts.

=== Elderly Benefits ===
Elderly Veterans can be eligible for a variety of benefits. VA benefits include disability compensation (tax free monetary benefit), pension (providing supplemental income), education and training (GI Bill), health care, home loans, insurance, Veteran Readiness and Employment (services to help with job training, education, and employment), and burial (pay up to $2,000 or $1,500 toward burial expense).

=== Other benefits ===
Additional benefits are available through the VA to qualifying Veterans including VA home loans, life insurance, pensions, and miscellaneous grants.

== History ==
Benefits first started in 1776 with the Pension Act of 1776. This granted pensions to disabled soldiers and their families. Archival record of the benefits awarded to injured soldiers and veterans of the American Civil War began after 1865. Union soldiers received a more committed pension archival effort on the part of the Federal government, thanks to superior databases in the North and a more stable bureaucratic oversight. Turmoil during Reconstruction in the war-weary South made any effort at maintaining pension records difficult if not impossible. Later university-led research projects would give insight into the history of pension provisions by the Federal government leading up to the Civil War. These analysis shed light on the ever-changing role of compensation in American society and delved into the idea that American Revolutionary War soldiers received superior care after war than later Civil War veterans.

=== World War I "Bonus" ===
After World War I, there was a major grass roots effort for paying a "Bonus" to all its veterans, resulting in the World War Adjusted Compensation Act of 1924 that promised payments in 1944. In 1932 thousands of veterans from the marched on Washington as the Bonus Army, also known as the Bonus Expeditionary Force, to demand benefits. President Herbert Hoover ordered it to be dispersed by the Army. Finally in 1936 the Adjusted Compensation Payment Act was passed over a President Franklin Roosevelt's veto and paid out $1.5 billion in cash and bonds (2% of GNP) to all the living veterans of 1917–1919, regardless of their needs.

== See also ==
- Adjusted Compensation Payment Act of 1936—the "Bonus"
  - World War Adjusted Compensation Act of 1924 promised a Bonus for all World War I veterans
- Benefits for United States veterans with post-traumatic stress disorder
- Bonus Army marched in 1932
- History of poverty in the United States
- Military dependent
- Title 37 of the United States Code: Pay and Allowances of the Uniformed Services
- Title 38 of the United States Code outlines the role of Veterans' Benefits in the United States Code
- Veterans Affairs, the government agency or department of various governments
- Veterans Benefits Administration, the US government agency
