= Bonus Bill =

Bonus Bill may refer to:

- Bonus Bill of 1817, U.S. proposed legislation vetoed by President Madison
- World War Adjusted Compensation Act, 1924 U.S. law
- Adjusted Compensation Payment Act, 1936 U.S. law
