= Walter W. Waters =

American soldier (1898–1959)

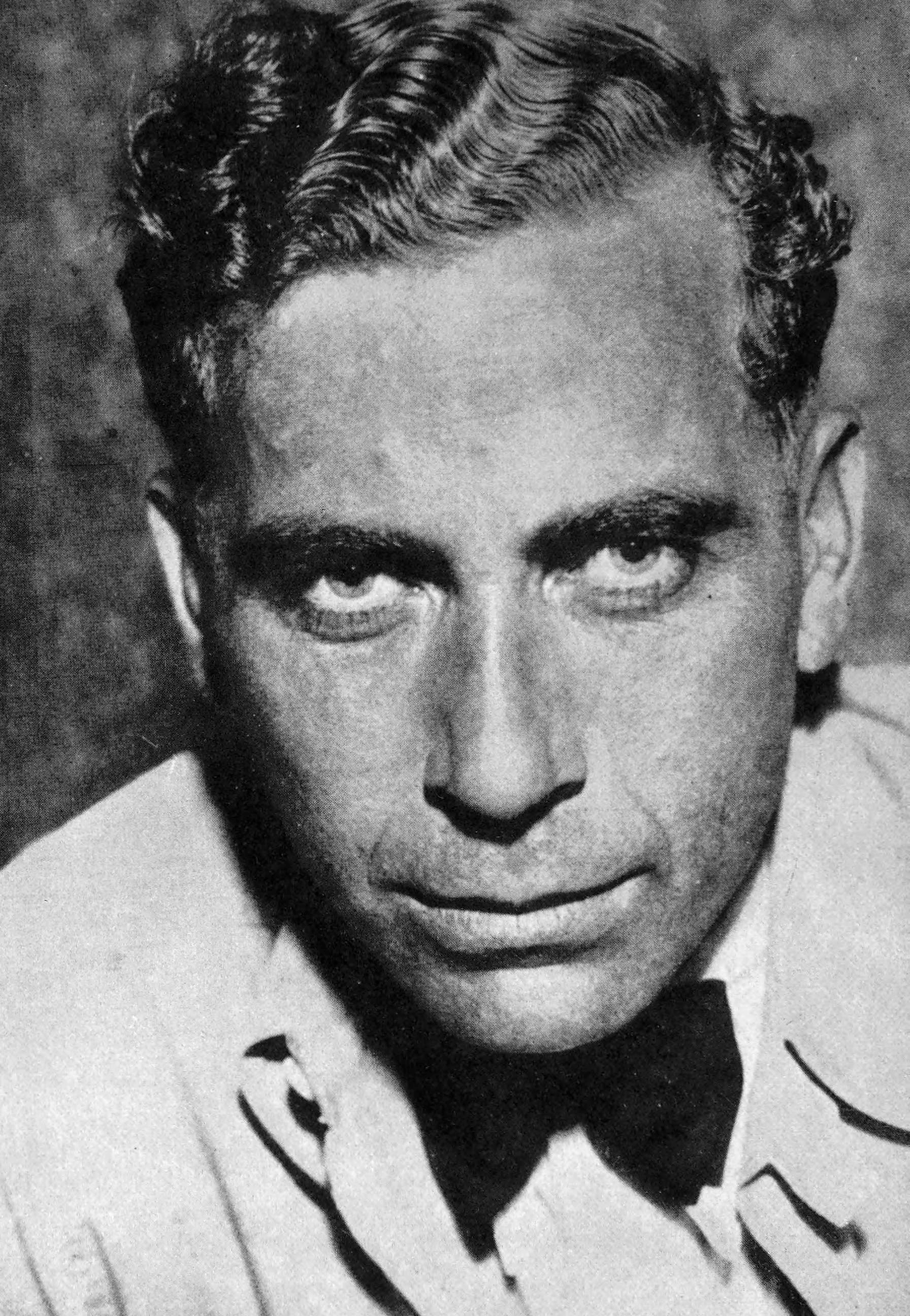
- Waters c. 1932

Commander of the Bonus Expeditionary Forces
- In office May 31, 1932 – October 8, 1932

Personal details
- Born: January 9, 1898 Burns, Oregon, U.S.
- Died: April 22, 1959 (aged 61) Walla Walla, Washington, U.S.
- Resting place: Wenatchee City Cemetery
- Spouse: Wilma Albertson (m. 1931)
- Children: 2
- Relatives: Errol T. Waters (brother)

Military service
- Allegiance: United States
- Branch/service: United States National Guard; United States Army
- Years of service: 1916–1919
- Rank: Sergeant
- Unit: Idaho National Guard; Oregon National Guard; 41st Infantry Division; 146th Field Artillery Regiment
- Battles/wars: Mexican Border War; Pancho Villa Expedition; World War I; Western Front; Battle of Saint-Mihiel; Battle of Château-Thierry; Meuse–Argonne offensive; Occupation of the Rhineland

Walter Warfield Waters (Note: Reported by some sources as Walter Willis Waters) (January 9, 1898 – April 22, 1959) was an American soldier and political activist who served as commander of the Bonus Expeditionary Forces during the 1932 Bonus March on Washington, D.C.

== Early life ==
According to an autobiographical account, Waters was born in Oregon in 1898 to a family of "old American stock". He was raised in Idaho and joined the National Guard at 18, being sent to reinforce American troops on the Pancho Villa Expedition. After his tour ended, Waters reenlisted in the Oregon National Guard, and upon American entry into World War I his unit was reassigned to the 146th Field Artillery Regiment and sent overseas. They served in the battles of Saint-Mihiel, Château-Thierry, and the Meuse–Argonne offensive, and after the Armistice in the Occupation of the Rhineland. He was honorably discharged in June 1919 with the rank of sergeant.

Upon returning home, Waters suffered health problems and was hospitalized for several months, then unsuccessfully pursued multiple careers, including as a garage mechanic, an automobile salesman, a farmhand, and a bakery helper. He later admitted that his trouble holding a job may have been the result of the "unsettling effects" of the war on him. Eager for a fresh start, Waters cut ties with his family, changed his name to "Bill Kincaid," and moved to Washington. He eventually settled in Wenatchee and worked his way up to superintendent of a cannery. However, the onset of the Great Depression led to the cannery being closed, and by 1932 he was again unemployed.

== Later life and death ==
In October 1932, the BEF held a national convention in Uniontown, Pennsylvania in which Waters was re-elected commander. However, he did not attend the convention as he was living in Miami, Florida and in ill health. Although the convention refused his resignation, he was granted a year's leave of absence to recuperate. Around the same time, he began writing a history of the Bonus Army that he would publish alongside journalist William Chapman White the following year.

Waters found his first job after the Bonus Army was disbanded in May 1933, working as a gas station attendant in Omaha, Nebraska. Waters also began to expound a political ideology he called "American Nationalism," which called for "elimination of wealth through high income taxes, employment insurance and labor participation in the profits of productive enterprise, compulsory five-day week and six-hour day, and... assurance that agriculture will be profitable." He claimed the program was distinct from socialism, fascism, and radicalism.

By October 1933, Waters was working as a cement inspector on the San Francisco–Oakland Bay Bridge. He made several public statements expressing his dissatisfaction with Congressional Democrats and President Franklin D. Roosevelt, who he felt had let veterans down like the Republicans had by passing the Economy Act of 1933. Waters entered government service soon after this; in 1934, he was hired by a federal agency in Virginia, and in 1935 he was hired by the Department of War, where his superior was none other than Douglas MacArthur (who was reported to have personally given him the job).

== Personal life ==
Waters married Wilma Albertson, a cannery worker, in 1931. They had two daughters together.

Waters's brother was Errol T. Waters, who served as chairman of the Idaho Democratic Party from 1965 to 1973.

== Works ==
- Waters, Walter W.; White, William C. (1933). B.E.F.; The Whole Story of the Bonus Army. New York: John Day Company.
