= Joseph T. Angelo =

World War I recipient of the Distinguished Service Cross (1896–1978)

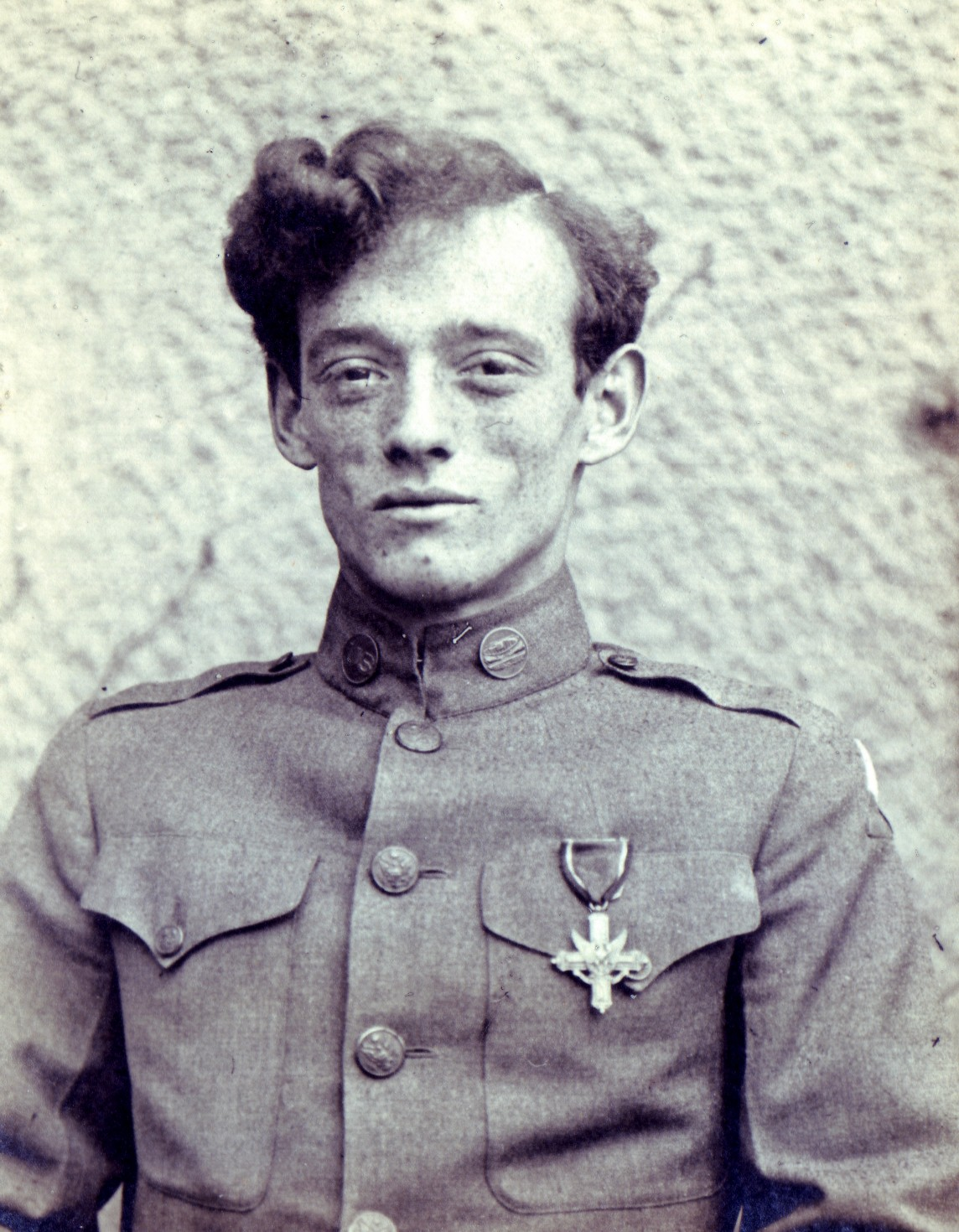
- Angelo in uniform, 1919
- Born: Joseph Thomas Angelo; February 16, 1896; Lattimer, Pennsylvania, U.S.
- Died: July 23, 1978 (aged 82); Atlantic City, New Jersey, U.S.
- Burial place: Arlington Park Cemetery, Pennsauken Township, New Jersey, U.S.
- Spouse: Sarah E. Force
- Children: 1
- Military career
- Branch: United States Army
- Service years: 1917–1919
- Rank: Private First Class
- Nickname: "Joe"
- Service number: 243496
- Units: Headquarters Company, 1st Brigade, Tank Corps
- Battles: World War I; St. Mihiel offensive; Meuse–Argonne offensive
- Awards: Distinguished Service Cross

Joseph Thomas Angelo (16 February 1896 – 23 July 1978) was an American soldier and World War I recipient of the Distinguished Service Cross. Prior to joining the U.S. Army, he worked for the Du Pont Powderworks, and was afterward in the Bonus Army march of 1932.

== Military service ==
Angelo was awarded the Distinguished Service Cross for his actions during the Meuse–Argonne offensive on September 26, 1918, as the Colonel's orderly with the 1st Brigade, Tank Corps, commanded by future General George S. Patton. During the battle, in an exposed position, Patton was seriously wounded by a machine gun. Showing great courage under enemy fire, Angelo dragged Patton to safety. The citation for his DSC reads:

The President of the United States of America, authorized by Act of Congress, July 9, 1918, takes pleasure in presenting the Distinguished Service Cross to Private First Class Joseph T. Angelo (ASN: 243496), United States Army, for extraordinary heroism in action while serving with Headquarters Company, 1st Brigade, Tank Corps, A.E.F., near Cheppy, France, 26 September 1918. Within 40 meters of the German machine guns, Private Angelo carried his wounded commanding officer into a shell hole and remained with him under continuous shell fire for over an hour, except when he twice carried orders to passing tanks.

In the spring of 1919, an interview appeared in American newspapers in which Patton declared Angelo "without doubt the bravest man in the American Army. I have never seen his equal." According to the interviewer, Angelo began "blushing furiously" as he related the following details:

[W]e went over the top at 6:30 in the morning. We had 150 tanks on the move and were plowing through a dense fog. As I was the Colonel's orderly I accompanied him in the advance.

We had fifteen men and two first lieutenants in our party. The tanks followed us. I was walking by the side of the Colonel, but when we came to a crossroad the Colonel told me to remain there and be on the watch for Germans.

While I was on duty two American Doughboys came along. I asked them what what their mission was they replied that they were 'just mopping up.' 'Well,' I said, 'if you don't get out of here you will get mopped up, as the Germans are pouring plenty of lead our way.' When several high explosive shells burst the Doughboys took refuge in a shack. A moment later a shell hit the shack. The Doughboys were blown to atoms. A moment later I saw two German machine gunners from behind a bush and they fired on me. I returned the fire and killed one; the other one beat it.

The Colonel, who was ahead of me, appeared on top of a knoll and shouted: 'Joe, is that you shooting down there?' Then I thought sure hell had broken loose. Bullets from machine guns just naturally rained all around.

'Come on, we'll clean out these nests,' shouted the Colonel, and I followed him up the hill. The Colonel was sore and couldn't understand why our boys couldn't break up those nests. Then he saw the tanks were not moving and sent me to see Captain [Math] English [who would later be killed] . . . to find out the cause. The tanks were stuck in the mud.

The Colonel ordered me to follow him and when he reached the tanks, almost hub deep in the mud, he grabbed a shovel and began digging the tanks free. Other men and I also got busy digging. The Germans were sending across a heavy artillery fire, but finally we got the tanks moving and took them over the hill.

The Colonel here found some infantrymen who did not know what to do, as their officers had been killed. The Colonel instructed me to place them with the tank detachment. Later the Colonel told me to get around to the side and wipe out the machine gun nests. 'Take fifteen men with you,' he ordered.

'I'm sorry,' I told him, 'but they have all been killed.' 'My God! They are not all gone?' the Colonel cried. When I told him the infantrymen had been killed by machine guns he ordered me to accompany him, declaring he would clear them out.

I thought the Colonel had gone mad, and grabbed him. He grabbed me by the hair and shook me to my senses. Then I followed him. We went about thirty yards and the Colonel fell with a bullet in his thigh.

I assisted the Colonel into a shellhole, bandaged his wounds and took observations of our surroundings[.] Shells flew all about us. Two hours later the Colonel revived and ordered me to go to Major [Sereno] Brett and instruct him to assume command of the tank corps [sic—304th Brigade]. I found him and did so. Then [I] reported back to the Colonel. A few moments later the Colonel, with three tanks, one French and two American, camped about twenty yards from the shellhole.

'Jump out there,' the Colonel ordered, 'and scatter those tanks or they will be blown up.' I rushed out, gave the order and came back again. The American tanks got away, but the French tank was shot to pieces and the men killed.

The colonel then ordered me to get out on top of our shellhole and prevent any oncoming tanks from getting below us, the fire from the enemy being terribly heavy. Then the Colonel said, 'Joe, the Germans have been making this shell hole a living hell since you left. Get a tank and wipe out those nests.' This was done and after that I found four infantrymen who carried the Colonel to the rear.

== Later life ==
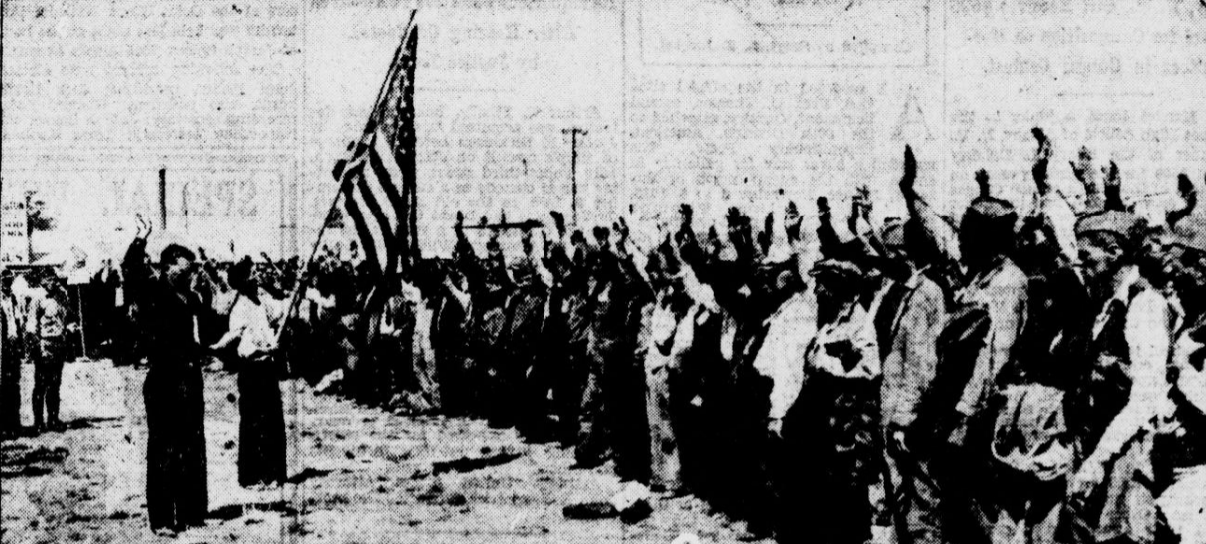
Joe Angelo (seen holding the flag) had his image captured for the Washington, DC newspaper Evening Star. He took part in a ceremony on June 9th, 1932 whereupon 250 veterans, who had been detained the previous night by police, were made to take the Oath of Allegiance- a pledge against liquor and communism. Angelo was not one of the 250 detained.

In 1932, while Patton continued his path on his famous military career, Angelo had returned to civilian life. He was unemployed and suffering along with many other veterans from the effects of the Great Depression. As a result, he joined the Bonus Army movement of First World War veterans demanding monetary compensation for their roles in the war. The particular issue was that these veterans had been promised compensation but they were not due to receive it until 1948 (the money was eventually awarded in 1936). Given the realities of the depression, veterans such as Angelo demanded the money be paid immediately. The veterans marched on Washington D.C., setting up camps in order to protest against the administration of President Herbert Hoover. On July 28, 1932, troops were ordered into the camps to quell the protest. In the resulting melee, two veterans were killed and many were injured. The commanders of the operation included Douglas MacArthur, Dwight D. Eisenhower, and Patton, the man saved by Angelo so many years before. In the aftermath of the assault on the camps, Angelo approached Patton, but was harshly rejected.

Spying Angelo, Patton said: "Sergeant, I do not know this man. Take him away and under no circumstances permit him to return." He explained to his fellow officers that Angelo had "dragged me from a shell hole under fire. I got him a decoration for it. Since the war, my mother and I have more than supported him. We have given him money. We have set him up in business several times. Can you imagine the headlines if the papers got word of our meeting here this morning. Of course, we'll take care of him anyway."

== Personal life ==
He was an active member of Corporal Matthews-Purnell Post, No. 518, Veterans of Foreign Wars of the United States, at Camden, New Jersey.

== Awards and decorations ==

Distinguished Service Cross

World War I Victory Medal with two bronze campaign stars	War Medal (France)	Croix de Guerre (France)
