= Adjusted Compensation Payment Act =

1936 United States legislation

- Long title: An Act to provide for the immediate payment of adjusted-service certificates
- Nicknames: Bonus Act
- Enacted by: the 74th United States Congress
- Announced in: the 68th United States Congress
- Effective: January 27, 1936

Citations
- Public law: Pub. L. 74–425
- Statutes at Large: 49 Stat. 1099

Codification
- Acts amended: World War Adjusted Compensation Act

Legislative history
- Introduced in the House as H.R. 12527 by Wright Patman; Committee consideration by House Ways and Means Committee; Passed the House on January 15, 1936 (325–44); Passed the Senate on January 24, 1936 (76–19); Vetoed by President Franklin D. Roosevelt on January 24, 1936; Overridden by the Congress on January 27, 1936 (322-98)

The Adjusted Compensation Payment Act (January 27, 1936, Pub. L. 74–425, 49 Stat. 1099) was a piece of United States legislation that provided for the issuance of US Treasury Bonds to veterans who had served in World War I as a form of economic stimulus and relief. The act is sometimes considered to be part of the "New Deal" though it was not supported by then President Franklin D. Roosevelt, and the law was one of several pieces of United States legislation popularly known together as the "Bonus Act," which was enacted after Congress overrode President Franklin D. Roosevelt's veto on January 27, 1936.

== Background ==
After World War I, there was a major grassroots effort for paying a "Bonus" to all its veterans, resulting in the World War Adjusted Compensation Act of 1924, which promised a payout in 1944.

World War I veterans who had been out of work due to the Great Depression organized themselves into the Bonus Army in 1932, whose principal demand was an immediate payout of the value of their bonuses. Under then-President Herbert Hoover, the demonstrators were forced to disperse by the U.S. Army, led by Douglas MacArthur.

Roosevelt, who succeeded Hoover, also opposed the immediate payout of the veterans' bonuses, but the Adjusted Compensation Payment Act of 1936 was passed when Congress overrode his veto. It paid out $1.5 billion in cash and bonds (2% of GNP) to all the living veterans of 1917-1919, regardless of their needs.

Congress had sustained Roosevelt's previous veto of an earlier version of the bill in 1935, called the Patman Greenback Bonus Bill. The President addressed a joint session of Congress to deliver his veto message. As he concluded his speech, he handed the unsigned bill to the Speaker of the House. Within an hour the House overrode the veto by a vote of 322 to 98. Even before the Senate sustained the veto, proponents were planning another attempt at passage. Roosevelt argued that the program would invite demands for similar treatment by other groups and that it was not a relief bill since it was not based on the demonstrated needs of the recipients. With respect to the veterans, aside from the wounded, he said: "I hold that that able-bodied citizen because he wore a uniform and for no other reason should be accorded no treatment different from that accorded to other citizens."

== Enactment ==
Congress sent another version of the bill to the President on January 22, 1936. As a symbolic response to the President's personal veto message in 1935, a Congressman personally delivered the bill to the White House by taxi. The bill became law when the Senate overrode the President's veto on January 27, 1936. The heads of veterans associations met with Roosevelt and promised that they would recommend their members to hold their bonds until they matured in 1945.

== Content ==
The Act replaced the service certificates awarded to veterans under the World War Adjusted Compensation Act of 1924 with bonds issued by the Treasury Department in denominations of $50. The bonds paid interest at an annual rate of 3 percent from June 15, 1936, to June 15, 1945, higher than rates available to savings accounts. Amounts less than $50 were paid immediately. The bonds could not be sold, but the Treasury would redeem them for cash at any time after June 15, 1936. Most veterans redeemed their bonds promptly. The Treasury issued bonds worth $1.745 billion initially. Between June 1935 and June 1936, 80% of the bonds issued had been redeemed. The Treasury paid more than $800 million in cash in the last two weeks of 1936 and almost $700 million more in the next year. The cash payments constituted an efficient economic stimulus since the program required little government administration, the monies were likely to be spent without delay, and the entire process did not require the long lead time of a public works program.

== Statistics ==
- Statistical Abstract of the United States 1938, no. 60 (Washington, DC: 1939), 153, "Adjusted Compensation awards as of June 30, 1937," available online
- Statistical Abstract of the United States 1943, no. 65 (Washington, DC: 1944), 174, "Adjusted Compensation awards as of June 30, 1942," available online
