= World War Adjusted Compensation Act =

1924 U.S. law

- Other short titles: Bonus Act
- Long title: An Act to provide adjusted compensation for veterans of the World War, and for other purposes
- Nicknames: Bonus Bill
- Enacted by: the 68th United States Congress

Citations
- Public law: Pub. L. 68–120
- Statutes at Large: 43 Stat. 121

Codification
- Titles amended: 38

Legislative history
- Introduced in the House as H.R. 7959; Passed the House on; Passed the Senate on; Signed into law by President Calvin Coolidge on May 19, 1924; Vetoed by President Calvin Coolidge on May 15, 1924; Overridden by the House on May 17, 1924 (313–78); Overridden by the Senate and became law on May 19, 1924 (59–26)

Major amendments
- Adjusted Compensation Payment Act (1936)

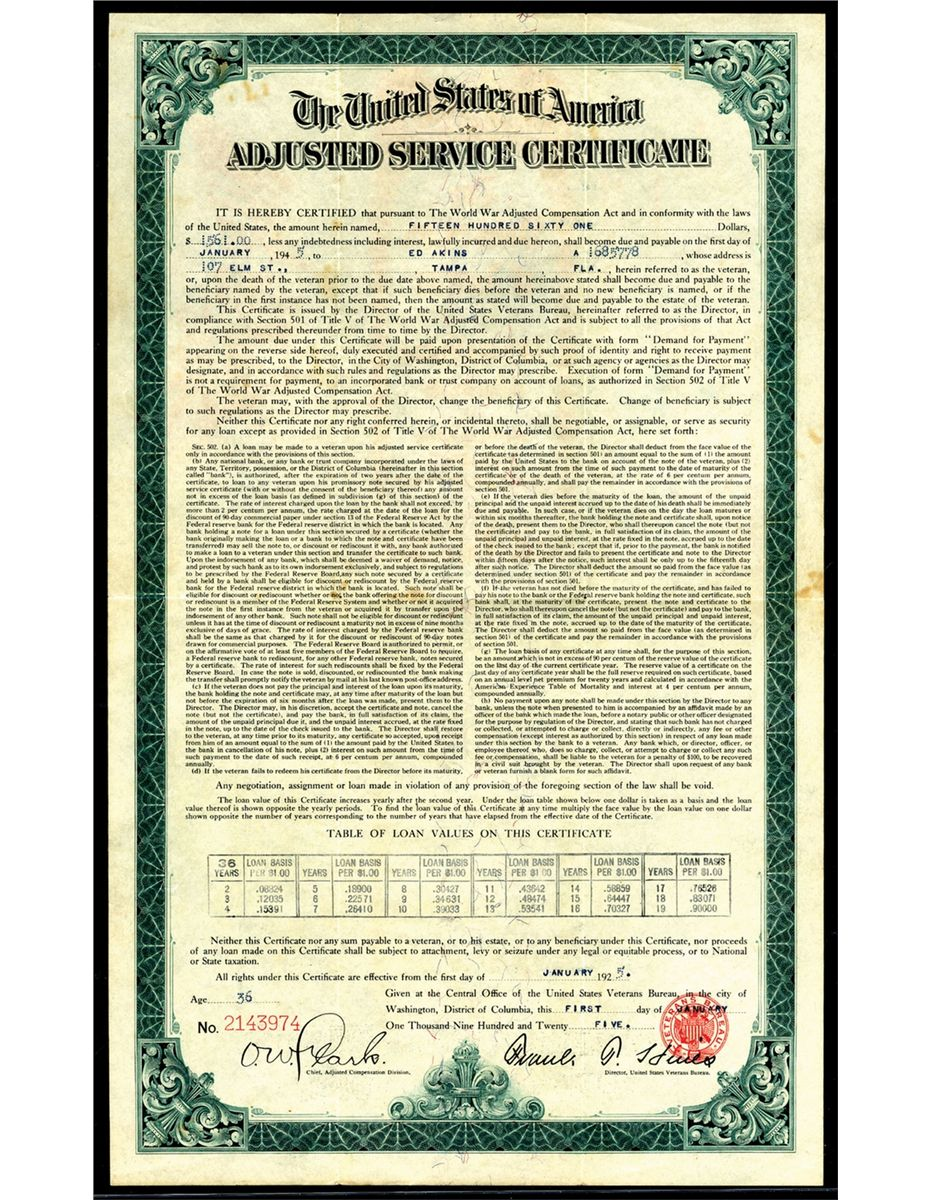
Adjusted Service Certificate

The World War Adjusted Compensation Act, or Bonus Act, was a United States federal law passed on May 19, 1924, that granted a life insurance policy to veterans of military service in World War I. It was based on aggressive political lobbying by new veterans organizations. The actual payout was promised for 1945, but veterans would get a certificate immediately and they could borrow against it from banks. When the Great Depression began in 1929, demands for immediate payment escalated. Thousands of veterans marched on Washington in 1932 but were crushed by the U.S. Army.

In 1933-1936 President Franklin Roosevelt was friendlier but opposed immediate payment as demanded by Congressman Wright Patman. Congress passed the Adjusted Compensation Payment Act over Roosevelt's veto in 1936, and over $2 billion was given out immediately. It helped boost the overall economy. A major effort in 1944 was made to avoid a similar issue with World War II veterans, resulting in the G.I. Bill.

== Provisions ==
The act awarded veterans additional pay in various forms, with only limited payments available in the short term. The value of each veteran's "credit" was based on each recipient's service in the United States Armed Forces between April 5, 1917, and July 1, 1919, with $1.00 awarded for each day served in the United States and $1.25 for each day served abroad. It set maximum payments at $500 (approximately $9,290 in 2025 dollars) for a veteran who served stateside and $625 for a veteran who served overseas. Most officers and anyone whose service began after November 11, 1918, were excluded.

It authorized immediate payments to anyone due less than $50. The estate of a deceased veteran could be paid his award immediately if the amount was less than $500. All others were awarded an "Adjusted Service Certificate," which functioned like an insurance policy. Based on standard actuarial calculations, the value of a veteran's certificate was set as the value of a 20-year insurance policy equal to 125 percent of the value of his service credit. Certificates were to be awarded on the veteran's birthday no earlier than January 1, 1925, and redeemable in full on his birthday in 1945, with payments to his estate if he died before then. Certificate holders were allowed to use them as collateral for loans under certain restrictions.

== Enactment ==
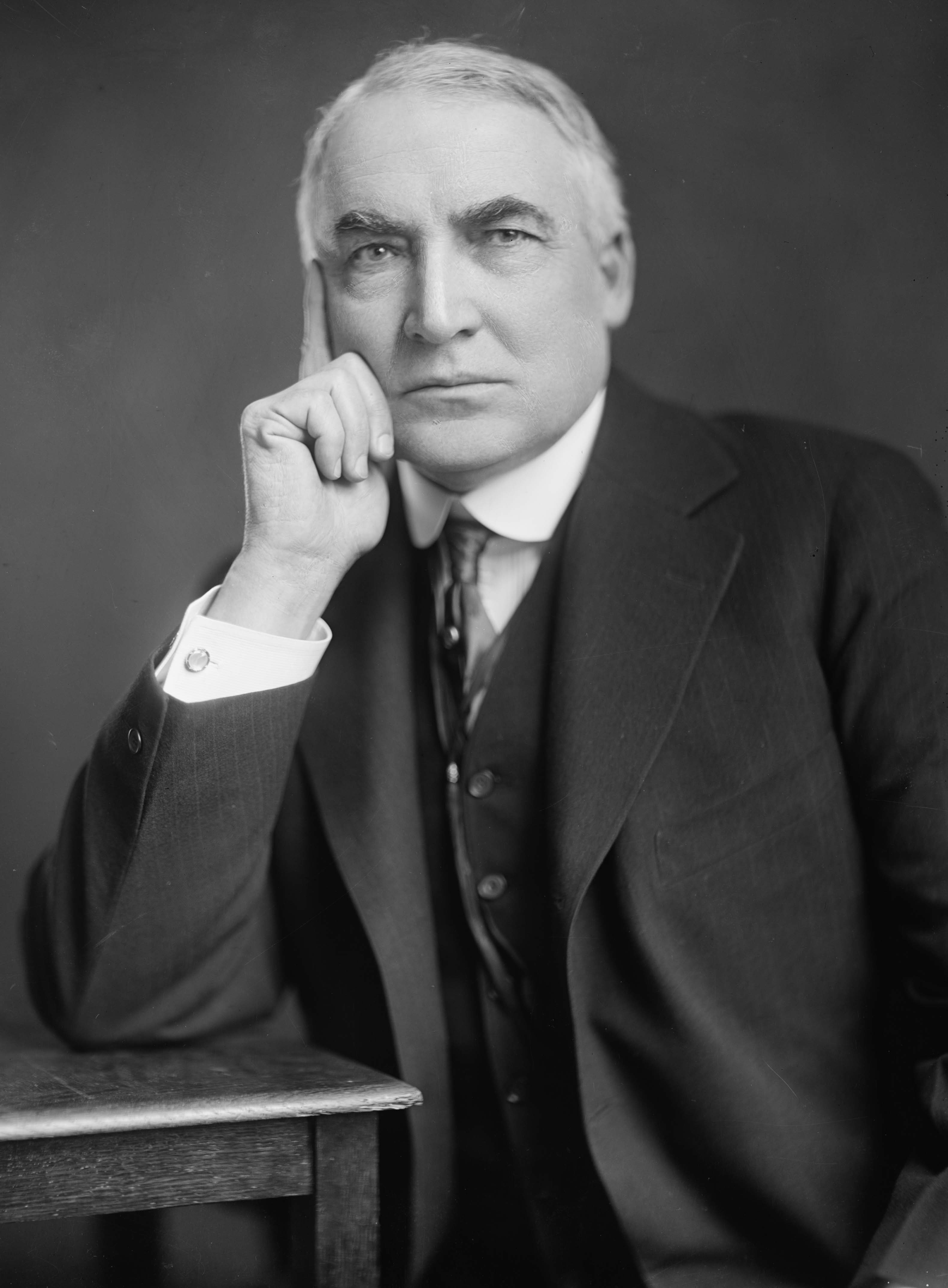
President Warren Harding (1921–1923), c. 1920

The new American Legion was a principal proponent of the legislation. It objected to the term bonus, because "bonus has come to mean 'full payment plus,' and there has not yet been full payment, or anywhere near full payment, so there cannot be any plus." The Legion said that the government needed to "restore the faith of men sorely tried by what they feel to be National ingratitude and injustice." The Legion pointed out that the Wilson administration had made additional payments to government workers in 1917–18 to help offset the effects of inflation, without making any comparable provision for members of the military.

The Legion fought President Warren G. Harding as his position changed from supporting payments if paired with a revenue measure, to supporting a future pension system. Harding felt so strongly about the issue that he visited the Senate to make his case against one version of the bill in 1921, and the Senate voted it down 47–29. Harding vetoed another version of the Adjusted Compensation Act on September 19, 1922, and the House overrode his veto 258–54 but the Senate failed to override by four votes on a vote that split both Democrats and Republicans.

Harding died before the issue was taken up again by Congress. In preliminary negotiations between Congress and President Calvin Coolidge, it became clear that the President would veto any law that proposed immediate cash payments to veterans and that the Senate would sustain that veto. The legislation, popularly called the Insurance Bill, provided the veteran instead with a variety of future payment scenarios rather than cash in the short term.

On May 15, 1924, Coolidge vetoed a bill granting bonuses to veterans of World War I saying: "patriotism ... bought and paid for is not patriotism." Congress overrode his veto a few days later.

== Later history ==
Veterans were able to take out loans against their certificates beginning in 1927. By June 30, 1932, more than 2.5 million veterans had borrowed $1.369 billion.

In 1936, the Adjusted Compensation Payment Act (January 27, 1936, ch. 32, 49 Stat. 1099) replaced the 1924 Act's service certificates with bonds issued by the Treasury Department that could be redeemed at any time.

== See also ==
- American Legion
- Bonus Army
