= Institutional economics =

Economics that focuses on institutions

Institutional economics focuses on understanding the role of the evolutionary process and the role of institutions in shaping economic behavior. Its original focus lay in Thorstein Veblen's instinct-oriented dichotomy between technology on the one side and the "ceremonial" sphere of society on the other. Its name and core elements trace back to a 1919 American Economic Review article by Walton H. Hamilton. Institutional economics emphasizes a broader study of institutions and views markets as a result of the complex interaction of these various institutions (e.g. individuals, firms, states, social norms). In general, the distinction of Institutional Economics is that, while Classical Economics focused on exchange between actors in markets or through macro level income flows and factors of production, Institution Economists placed their focus within productive units as organizations composed of people in societies. This gave Institutional Economics a broad purview within the social sciences, and an empirical focus on real world interactions to explain things abstract models based on homo economicus did not. The earlier tradition continues today as a leading heterodox approach to economics. Institutional Economics, particularly New Institutional Economics, also continues to contribute to a wide variety of disciplines, including Industrial Relations, Organizational Theory, Management Studies and Public Administration, among others.

"Traditional" institutionalism rejects the reduction of institutions to simply tastes, technology, and nature (see naturalistic fallacy). Tastes, along with expectations of the future, habits, and motivations, not only determine the nature of institutions but are limited and shaped by them. If people live and work in institutions on a regular basis, it shapes their world views. Fundamentally, this traditional institutionalism (and its modern counterpart institutionalist political economy) emphasizes the legal foundations of an economy (see John R. Commons) and the evolutionary, habituated, and volitional processes by which institutions are erected and then changed (see John Dewey, Thorstein Veblen, and Daniel Bromley). Institutional economics focuses on learning, bounded rationality, and evolution (rather than assuming stable preferences, rationality and equilibrium). It was a central part of American economics in the first part of the 20th century, including such famous but diverse economists as Thorstein Veblen, Wesley Mitchell, and John R. Commons. Some institutionalists see Karl Marx as belonging to the institutionalist tradition, because he described capitalism as a historically bounded social system; other institutionalist economists disagree with Marx's definition of capitalism, instead seeing defining features such as markets, money and the private ownership of production as indeed evolving over time, but as a result of the purposive actions of individuals.

A significant variant is the new institutional economics from the later 20th century, which integrates later developments of neoclassical economics into the analysis. Law and economics has been a major theme since the publication of the Legal Foundations of Capitalism by John R. Commons in 1924. Since then, there has been heated debate on the role of law (a formal institution) on economic growth. Behavioral economics is another hallmark of institutional economics based on what is known about psychology and cognitive science, rather than simple assumptions of economic behavior.

Some of the authors associated with this school include Daron Acemoglu, Robert H. Frank, Warren Samuels, Marc Tool, Geoffrey Hodgson, Daniel Bromley, Jonathan Nitzan, Shimshon Bichler, Elinor Ostrom, Anne Mayhew, John Kenneth Galbraith and Gunnar Myrdal, but even the sociologist C. Wright Mills was highly influenced by the institutionalist approach in his major studies.

== Thorstein Veblen ==
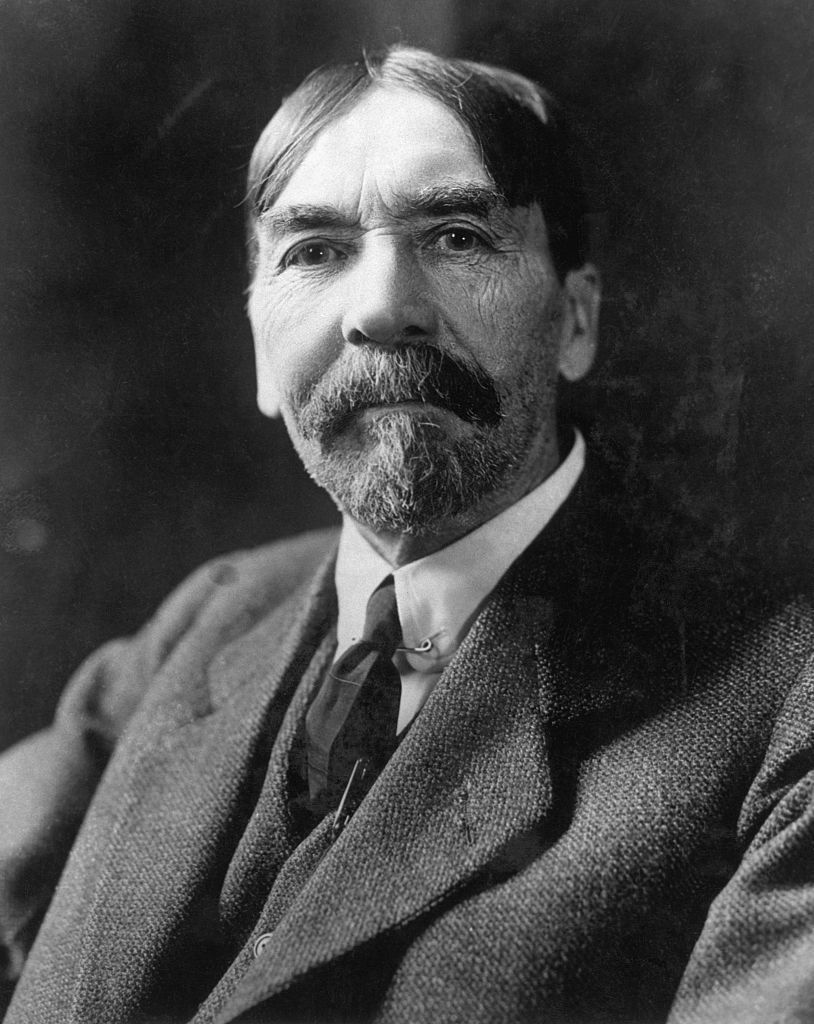
Thorstein Veblen came from a Norwegian immigrant family in rural Mid-western America.

Thorstein Veblen (1857–1929) wrote his first and most influential book while he was at the University of Chicago, on The Theory of the Leisure Class (1899). In it he analyzed the motivation in capitalism for people to conspicuously consume their riches as a way of demonstrating success. Conspicuous leisure was another focus of Veblen's critique.

In The Theory of Business Enterprise (1904), Veblen distinguished the motivations of industrial production for people to use things from business motivations that used, or misused, industrial infrastructure for profit, arguing that the former is often hindered because businesses pursue the latter. Output and technological advance are restricted by business practices and the creation of monopolies. Businesses protect their existing capital investments and employ excessive credit, leading to depressions and increasing military expenditure and war through business control of political power. These two books, focusing on criticism first of consumerism, and second of profiteering, did not advocate change.

Through the 1920s and after the Wall Street Crash of 1929 Thorstein Veblen's warnings of the tendency for wasteful consumption and the necessity of creating sound financial institutions seemed to ring true.

Thorstein Veblen wrote in 1898 an article entitled "Why is Economics Not an Evolutionary Science?" and he became the precursor of current evolutionary economics.

== John R. Commons ==
John R. Commons (1862–1945) also came from mid-Western America. Underlying his ideas, consolidated in Institutional Economics (1934) was the concept that the economy is a web of relationships between people with diverging interests. There are monopolies, large corporations, labour disputes and fluctuating business cycles. They do however have an interest in resolving these disputes.

Commons thought that government should be the mediator between the conflicting groups. Commons himself devoted much of his time to advisory and mediation work on government boards and industrial commissions.

== Wesley Mitchell ==
Wesley Clair Mitchell (1874–1948) was an American economist known for his empirical work on business cycles and for guiding the National Bureau of Economic Research in its first decades. Mitchell's teachers included economists Thorstein Veblen and J. L. Laughlin and philosopher John Dewey.

== Clarence Ayres ==
Clarence Ayres (1891–1972) was the principal thinker of what some have called the Texas school of institutional economics. Ayres developed on the ideas of Thorstein Veblen with a dichotomy of "technology" and "institutions" to separate the inventive from the inherited aspects of economic structures. He claimed that technology was always one step ahead of the socio-cultural institutions.

Ayres was heavily influenced by the philosophy of John Dewey. Dewey and Ayres both utilized the instrumental theory of value to analyze problems and propose solutions. According to this theory, something has value if it enhances or furthers the life process of mankind. Therefore, this should become the criterion to be utilized in determining the future courses of action.

It can be argued that Ayres was not an "institutionalist" in any normal sense of the term, since he identified institutions with sentiments and superstition and in consequence institutions only played a kind of residual role in this theory of development which core center was that of technology. Ayres was under strong influence of Hegel and institutions for Ayres had the same function as "Schein" (with the connotation of deception, and illusion) for Hegel. A more appropriate name for Ayres' position would be that of a "techno-behaviorist" rather than an institutionalist.

== Adolf Berle ==
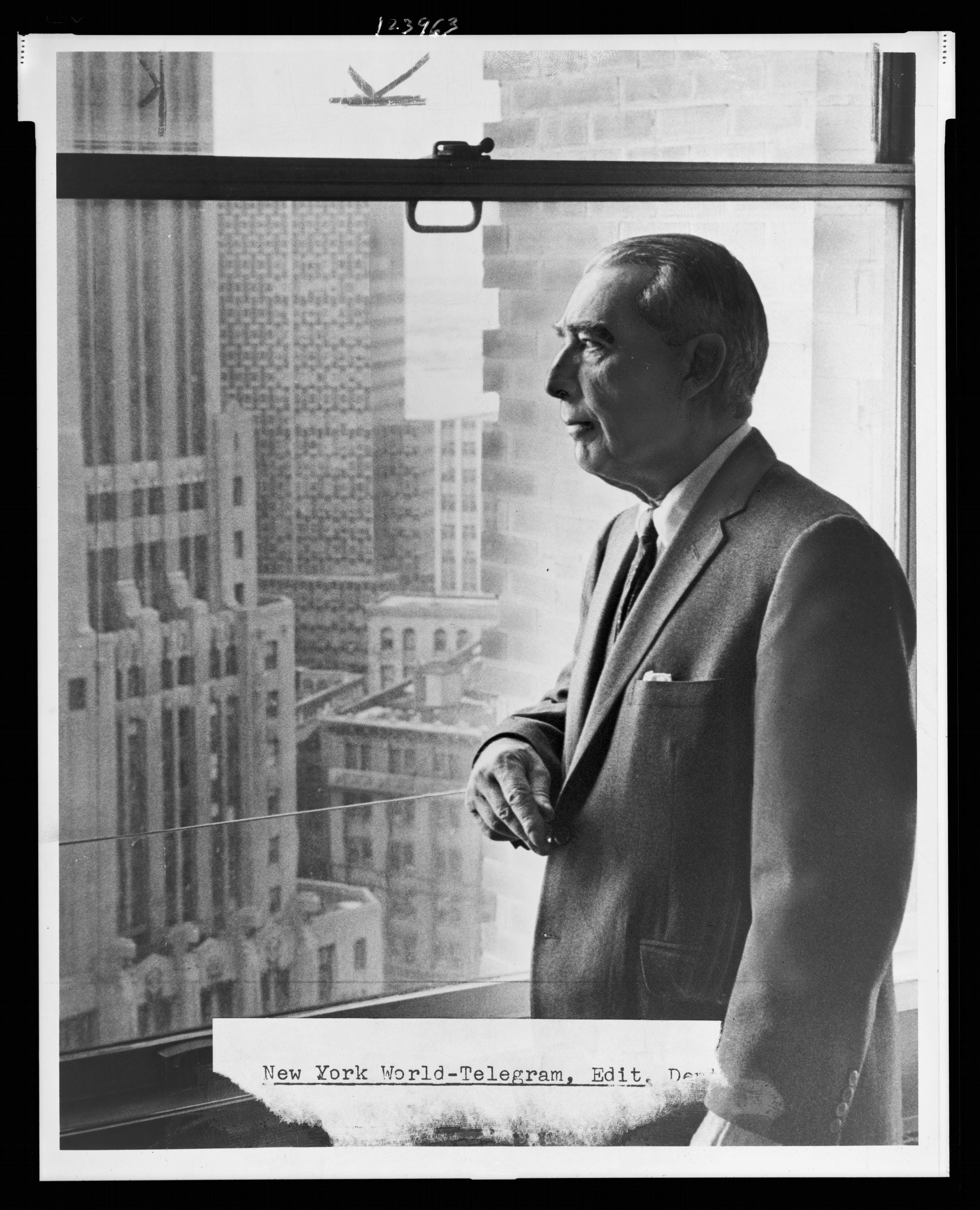
Adolf Augustus Berle Jr.

Adolf A. Berle (1895–1971) was one of the first authors to combine legal and economic analysis, and his work stands as a founding pillar of thought in modern corporate governance. Like Keynes, Berle was at the Paris Peace Conference, 1919, but subsequently resigned from his diplomatic job dissatisfied with the Versailles Treaty terms. In his book with Gardiner C. Means, The Modern Corporation and Private Property (1932), he detailed the evolution in the contemporary economy of big business, and argued that those who controlled big firms should be better held to account.

Directors of companies are held to account to the shareholders of companies, or not, by the rules found in company law statutes. This might include rights to elect and fire the management, require for regular general meetings, accounting standards, and so on. In 1930s America, the typical company laws (e.g. in Delaware) did not clearly mandate such rights. Berle argued that the unaccountable directors of companies were therefore apt to funnel the fruits of enterprise profits into their own pockets, as well as manage in their own interests. The ability to do this was supported by the fact that the majority of shareholders in big public companies were single individuals, with scant means of communication, in short, divided and conquered.

Berle served in President Franklin Delano Roosevelt's administration through the depression, and was a key member of the so-called "Brain trust" developing many of the New Deal policies. In 1967, Berle and Means issued a revised edition of their work, in which the preface added a new dimension. It was not only the separation of controllers of companies from the owners as shareholders at stake. They posed the question of what the corporate structure was really meant to achieve.

Stockholders toil not, neither do they spin, to earn [dividends and share price increases]. They are beneficiaries by position only. Justification for their inheritance... can be founded only upon social grounds... that justification turns on the distribution as well as the existence of wealth. Its force exists only in direct ratio to the number of individuals who hold such wealth. Justification for the stockholder's existence thus depends on increasing distribution within the American population. Ideally the stockholder's position will be impregnable only when every American family has its fragment of that position and of the wealth by which the opportunity to develop individuality becomes fully actualized.

== John Kenneth Galbraith ==
John Kenneth Galbraith (1908–2006) worked in the New Deal administration of Franklin Delano Roosevelt. Although he wrote later, and was more developed than the earlier institutional economists, Galbraith was critical of orthodox economics throughout the late twentieth century. In The Affluent Society (1958), Galbraith argues voters reaching a certain material wealth begin to vote against the common good. He uses the term "conventional wisdom" to refer to the orthodox ideas that underpin the resulting conservative consensus.

In an age of big business, it is unrealistic to think only of markets of the classical kind. Big businesses set their own terms in the marketplace, and use their combined resources for advertising programmes to support demand for their own products. As a result, individual preferences actually reflect the preferences of entrenched corporations, a "dependence effect", and the economy as a whole is geared to irrational goals.

In The New Industrial State Galbraith argues that economic decisions are planned by a private bureaucracy, a technostructure of experts who manipulate marketing and public relations channels. This hierarchy is self-serving, profits are no longer the prime motivator, and even managers are not in control. Because they are the new planners, corporations detest risk, requiring steady economic and stable markets. They recruit governments to serve their interests with fiscal and monetary policy.

While the goals of an affluent society and complicit government serve the irrational technostructure, public space is simultaneously impoverished. Galbraith paints the picture of stepping from penthouse villas on to unpaved streets, from landscaped gardens to unkempt public parks. In Economics and the Public Purpose (1973) Galbraith advocates a "new socialism" (social democracy) as the solution, with nationalization of military production and public services such as health care, plus disciplined salary and price controls to reduce inequality and hamper inflation.

== New institutional economics ==
With the new developments in the economic theory of organizations, information, property rights, and transaction costs, an attempt was made to integrate institutionalism into more recent developments in mainstream economics, under the title new institutional economics.

== Criticism ==
Critics of institutionalism have maintained that the concept of "institution" is so central for all social science that it is senseless to use it as a buzzword for a particular theoretical school. And as a consequence, the elusive meaning of the concept of "institution" has resulted in a bewildering and never-ending dispute about which scholars are "institutionalists" or not—and a similar confusion about what is supposed to be the core of the theory. In other words, institutional economics has become so popular because it means all things to all people, which in the end of the day is the meaning of nothing.

Indeed, it can be argued that the term "institutionalists" was misplaced from the very beginning, since Veblen, Hamilton and Ayres were preoccupied with the evolutionary (and "objectifying") forces of technology and institutions had a secondary place within their theories. Institutions were almost a kind of "anti-stuff"; their key concern was on technology and not on institutions. Rather than being "institutional," Veblen, Hamilton and Ayres’ position is anti-institutional.

== Response ==
According to Thaler and Sunstein, a person is not generally best described as an Econ, a person with mainly self-interest in mind, but rather as a Human. Institutional economics, consistent with Thaler and Sunstein, sees humans as social and part of a community, which has been extracted from neoclassical economics. The Metaeconomics Frame and Dual Interest Theory argues that it is essential to integrate institutional and neoclassical economics.

== Journals ==
- Journal of Economic Issues and article-abstract links to 2008.
- Journal of Institutional Economics with links to selected articles and to article abstracts.
- Journal of Institutional and Theoretical Economics
- Evolutionary and Institutional Economics Review

== See also ==
- Institutional economists (category)
- Constitutional economics
- Critical juncture theory
- Democracy and economic growth
- History of economic thought
- Economic sociology
- Historical school of economics, a related school developed in Prussia
- Institutional logic
- New institutionalism
- Perspectives on Capitalism
- Substantivism
