= J. K. Galbraith =

J. K. Galbraith is the name of:

- John Kenneth Galbraith (1908–2006), Canadian economist and public official
- James K. Galbraith (born 1952), American economist
