= Kourosh Zaim =

Iranian author, inventor and engineer

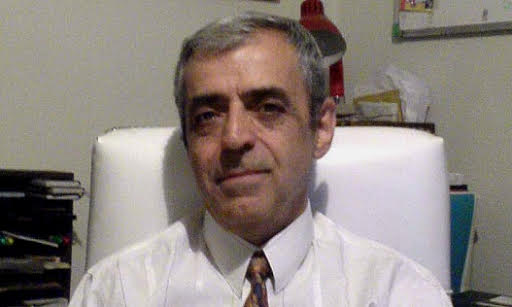
Kourosh Zaim speaking from his home office near Tehran in early 2009.

Kourosh Zaim (Note: His name is also romanized as Koorosh Zaim or Korosh Za'eem or Kurosh Zaeim) (Persian: کورش زعیم; born May 17, 1939) is an Iranian author, inventor, engineer, translator, and nonviolent political activist. He was born in Kashan, Iran, on May 17, 1939. A vocal advocate of secular democracy and human rights since youth, Kourosh rose to prominence as a political analyst and Secretary to the Leadership Committee of Iran's National Front party, or Jebhe Melli, Iran's largest pro-democracy political organization. Membership in Jebhe Melli has been illegal since 1981.

== Arrest ==
Zaim was detained in February 2011, only hours after an interview with Radio Farda of RFE/RL was broadcast. As of 2017, Kourosh is incarcerated in Iran as a political prisoner. He was last arrested on July 16, 2016, for charges of "undermining the Islamic Republic" and "promoting anti-regime activity", and is currently serving a four-year prison term in Evin Prison, the sixth time he has been imprisoned for his views since Iran's Islamic Revolution. He was briefly released in 2017 for medical treatment and he also is one of the oldest political detainees in Iran. Much of his time as a political prisoner has been spent in solitary confinement. He has been represented in the past by human rights attorneys Nasrin Sotoudeh and Nobel Laureate Shirin Ebadi. He is currently being represented by Giti Pourfazel, a well-known human rights lawyer currently planning her immanent retirement due to "years of state harassment and threats."

== Family ==
Kourosh was born in Kashan, Iran, on May 17, 1939, to mother Khanoum Khanima Assadi and father Javad Zaim (deceased), a businessman and political activist. Kourosh is the oldest of four siblings: Soudabeh, Siamak and Bahram. Kourosh's mother is from the Naraghi family, a line of influential Shi'ite clerics.

Kourosh's great-grandfather Mahmud Zaim was Kashan's largest tobacco cultivator. In 1891, Mahmud organized a rebellion with Iran's other two major tobacco growers, in which they burned their entire crop of tobacco in defiance of the shah's tobacco trade concession to Great Britain. This forced Iran's top cleric, Mirzaye Shirazi, to sign a fatwa against the agreement, which helped foment a people's movement against the trade agreement that came to be called the Tobacco Protest. The Shah was forced to cancel the trade agreement the following year. The Tobacco Protest was the first nationwide rebellion in Iran's modern history. Many scholars believe it to be the moment Iranians realized they could oust foreign exploiters through solidarity which later led to the Persian Constitutional Revolution a few years later.

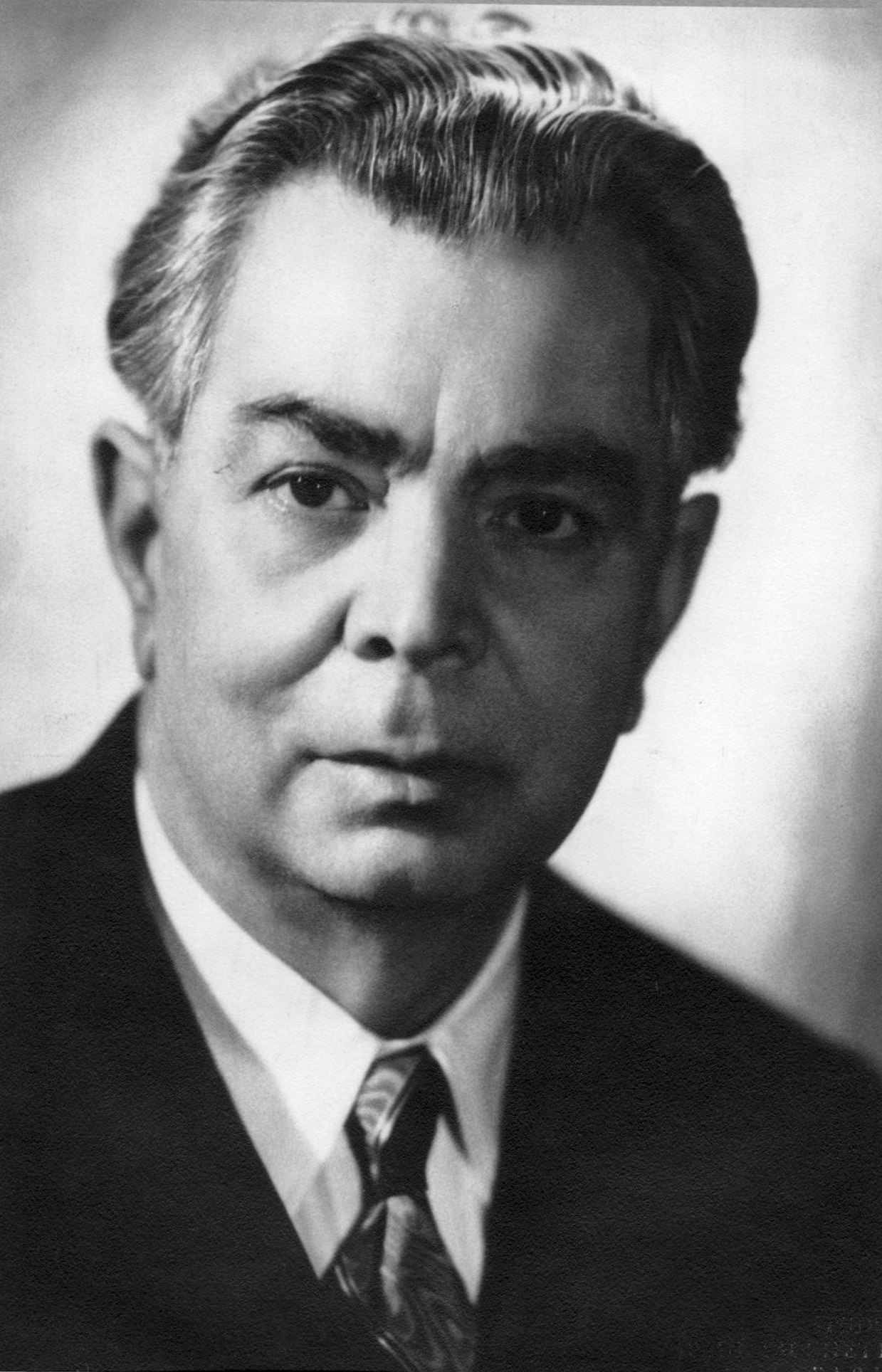
Kourosh Zaim's uncle, activist during Constitutional Revolution, PM, exiled, poisoned.

Kourosh's great uncle, Seyed Hassan i Zaim, a political activist during the Persian Constitutional Revolution (1905–07), member of Iran's 4th, 5th, and 6th post-revolutionary Parliaments (1921–25) and Speaker for the Minority Faction, undertook to impeach Reza Shah for totalitarian rule. He was threatened with execution and fled to Europe, where he spent the next 17 years in exile. In 1946, in partnership with Mohammad Mosaddegh, Hassan returned to Iran to create a new minority faction in the parliament. He was elected from his home city of Kashan, but the night after the election results had been announced, an envoy from the Shah came to him posing as a congratulator and offered coffee to him. He was declared dead and buried the next day after the examining coroner reported that his eyes and fingers were still moving and that he should be taken to a hospital.

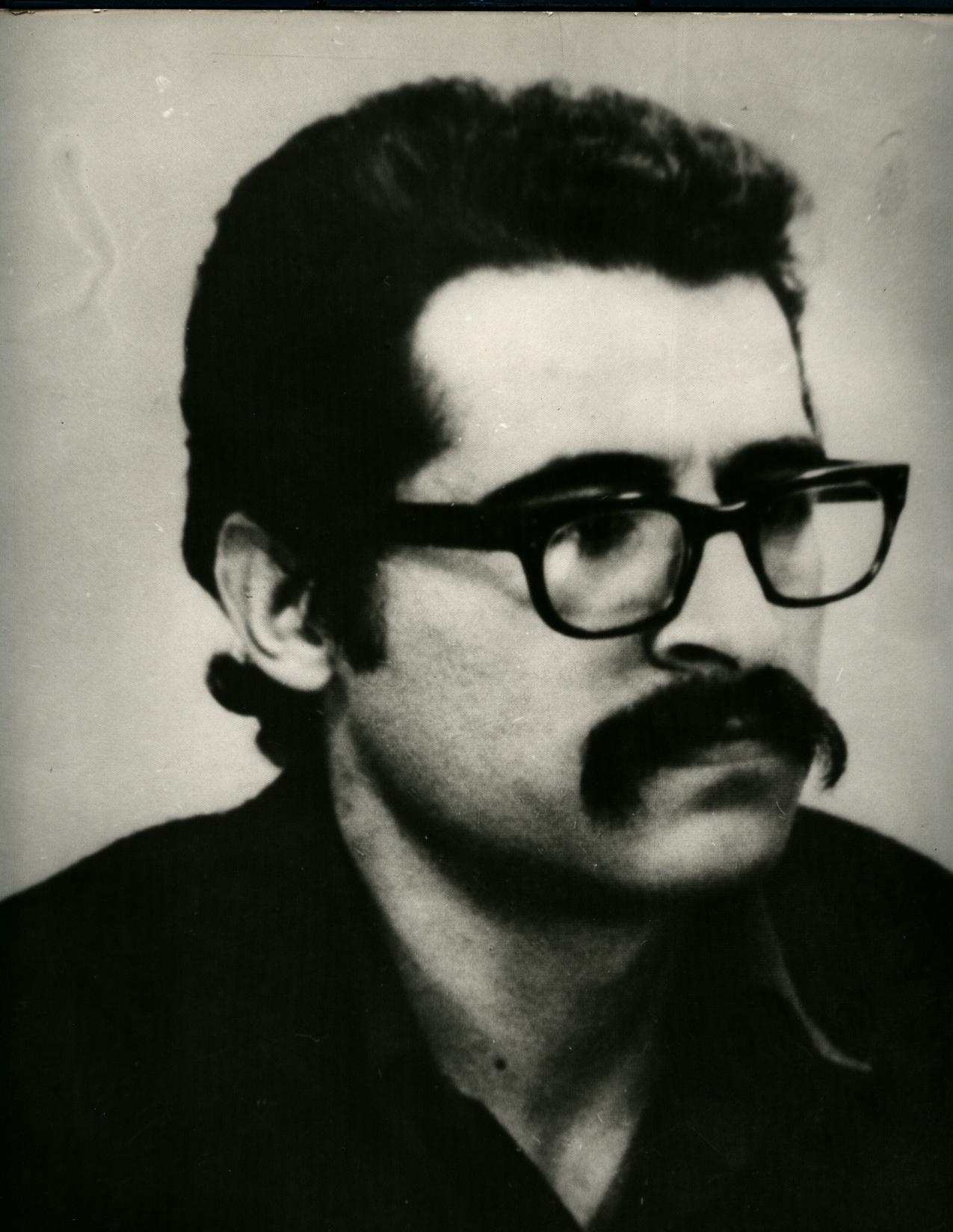
Kourosh Zaim's younger brother. Communist rebel leader and strategist. Imprisoned in Iran with promise and sentence not be executed. Executed.

Siamak Zaim, the older of Kourosh's two younger brothers, was a famous leftist and communist thinker who escaped Iran during the Islamic Revolution and fled to Berkeley, California, U.S., where he founded the Communist Party of Iran of the U.S. In early 1982, he snuck back into Iran and became a leader of the 1982 Amol uprising. The revolt was considered an existential threat by the new revolutionary government, and the town was surrounded and all the rebels captured or killed. For being unarmed himself and for actions displaying a desire to protect innocent life and to end the firefight, the Revolutionary Government granted him a prison sentence rather than immediate execution. He was held incommunicado for two years in Evin Prison and then executed by firing squad anyway in 1984.

Kourosh's youngest brother, Bahram Zaim, was falsely arrested for being at a movie theater that was taken over by mujahideen fighters. Iran's Revolutionary Guard assumed Bahram was a mujahideen fighter, and imprisoned him for four and a half years.

Kourosh was married twice: to an American in 1975, bearing two sons; and to an Iranian in 1985, also bearing two sons. The eldest of these four brothers, Turaj, escaped to the United States during the Iran–Iraq War, and is an American artist and activist. In 2009, Turaj focused his activism around his father, whose plight is emblematic of many of Iran's imprisoned and persecuted human rights activists.

== Scholarship ==
Kourosh has authored many books, translated numerous texts from English into Persian, and published many articles and interviews on both scientific and political topics; including the works of Stephen Hawking and Karl Popper. He taught mathematics at Chicago Technical College (1968–1970) and advised Business Administration PhD students at Tehran University (2005–2008). Kourosh has also argued many times for the preservation of ancient Iranian heritage sites, as well as other UNESCO world heritage sites.

Prior to his most recent imprisonment, he was advancing his Theory of Fundamental Digital Particles to European researchers of the Higgs boson particle.

== Education ==
- BCSE Structural Engineering, Univ. of Illinois 1962
- MBA Business Administration, Roosevelt University, Chicago 1965
- PhD Business Administration (incomplete due to imprisonment)
- International Law, doctorate classes, Kharazmi University, Iran (also incomplete due to imprisonment)

Kourosh's unsubmitted doctoral thesis in business administration was translated into Persian and published as a book inside Iran, then submitted to Iran's parliament as a legislative proposal.

== Publications in English ==
- Research Paper: Test of Fiberglass Bundles, Univ. of Illinois, 1962
- Research Paper: Fiberglass Bundles Stress Behavior, Univ. of Illinois, 1963
- Editor-in-Chief of Chicago Town Weekly, 1968–72

== Publications in Persian ==
- A Dot on Water: Short Stories, 1952
- When Pigeons Start to Fly (fiction), 1953
- The Great Men of Kashan (biographies), 1954
- Whirlwind (fiction), 1955
- Imperialism and the Oil Routes in the Middle East, 1979
- Factory Design, 1980
- Mathematics Handbook, 1982
- Construction Handbook, 1983
- Wood, 1984
- Timber, 1985
- Zaim, Kourosh (2001). Iran National Front.
- Vital Energy, 2006

== Translations Into Persian ==
- Collection of Stories, Dashiell Hemet & Allan Alston, 1952
- Quentin Durward, Sir Walter Scott, 1953
- Beauty & Health, Geraldine Bryant, 1954
- Savonarola and the Republic, Will Durant, 1980
- Socialism in our Past and Future, Igor Shafarevich, 1981
- The Nature of Mass Poverty, Prof. Kenneth Galbraith, 1982
- The Future of Man, William Clark Graham, 1983
- The Theories of Imperialism, Prof. Wolfgang Mumson, 1984
- Democracy and Responsibility, Karl Popper, 2000
- A Brief History of Time, Stephen Hawking, 2004
- The Universe in a Nutshell, Stephen Hawking,2013
- The Grand Design, Stephen Hawking and Leonard Mlodinow, 2014
- The Theory of Everything (book)|The Theory of Everything, Stephen Hawking, 2014
- Hedrick, Larry (2008). Xenophon's Cyrus the Great(the Art of Leadership). p. 233. ISBN 978-1-595-84191-9.

== Inventions ==
- Snow Bike (snow-ice-water vehicle), U.S.A., Canada, and Iran, 1972

== Membership ==
- American Society of Civil Engineers (1966)
- American Management Society (1970)
- Iran Structural Engineers Society (1975)
- Iran Economists Society (1980)
- American Project Management Society (1982)
