= The Great Crash, 1929 =

1955 book by John Kenneth Galbraith

- First edition
- Author: John Kenneth Galbraith
- Language: English
- Genre: Non-fiction
- Publisher: Houghton Mifflin
- Publication date: 1955

The Great Crash, 1929 is a book written by John Kenneth Galbraith and published in 1955. It is an economic history of the lead-up to the Wall Street crash of 1929. The book argues that the 1929 stock market crash was precipitated by rampant speculation in the stock market, that the common denominator of all speculative episodes is the belief of participants that they can become rich without work and that the tendency towards recurrent speculative orgy serves no useful purpose, but rather is deeply damaging to an economy. It was Galbraith's belief that a good knowledge of what happened in 1929 was the best safeguard against its recurrence.

== The idea for the book ==
Galbraith wrote the book during a break from working on the manuscript of what would become The Affluent Society. Galbraith was asked by Arthur M. Schlesinger Jr. if he would write the definitive work on the Great Depression that he would then use as a reference source for his own intended work on Roosevelt. Galbraith chose to concentrate on the days that ushered in the depression. "I never enjoyed writing a book more; indeed, it is the only one I remember in no sense as a labor but as a joy." Galbraith received much praise for his work, including his humorous observations of human behavior during the speculative stock market bubble and subsequent crash. The publication of the book, which was one of Galbraith's first bestsellers, coincided with the 25th anniversary of the crash, at a time when it and the Great Depression that followed were still raw memories – and stock price levels were only then recovering to pre-crash levels. Galbraith considered it the useful task of the historian to keep fresh the memory of such crashes, the fading of which he correlates with their re-occurrence.

== The speculative bubble ==
The Florida land boom of the 1920s established the mood "and the conviction that God intended the American middle classes to be rich," a sentiment so strong that it survived the ensuing crash of property prices. In the early 1920s, yields of common stocks were favorable and prices low. In the final six months of 1924, prices began to rise and continued through 1925, from 106 in May 1924 stock prices rose to 181 by December 1925. After a couple of short downturns during 1926, prices began to increase in earnest throughout 1927, the year in which conventional wisdom saw the seeds of what became the Great Crash sown. Following Britain's return to the Gold Standard, and subsequent foreign exchange crises, there followed an exodus of gold from Europe to the United States.

In the spring of 1927, Montagu Norman and other governors of European Banks asked the Federal Reserve to ease their monetary policy and they agreed, reducing the rediscount rate from 4 to 3.5%, a move that Lionel Robbins described as resulting "in one of the most costly errors committed by it or any other banking system in the last 75 years". The funds released by the Fed became available to invest in the stock market and "from that date, according to all the evidence, the situation got completely out of control". Galbraith disagreed with this simplistic analysis by arguing that the availability of money in the past was no sure recipe for a bubble in common stocks and that prices could still be regarded as a true valuation of the stock at the end of 1927. It is early in 1928 that the "escape into make believe" started in earnest, when the market began to rise by large vaulting leaps rather than steady increments. Prominent investors, such as Harrison Williams, the proponent of both the Shenandoah and the Blue Ridge Trust, were described by Professor Dice as "having vision for the future and boundless hope and optimism" and not "hampered by the heavy armour of tradition".

On 12 March, the volume of trading had reached 3,875,910 shares, an all-time high. By 20 June, 5,052,790 shares were traded in a falling market that many prematurely thought signalled the end of the bull market. Prices rose once more and after the election of Hoover, with a "victory boom" resulting in an all-time record trading of 6,641,250 shares in a rising market (16 November). Overall, the market rose during the year from 245 to 331 which was accompanied by a phenomenal increase in trading on margin, which relieved the buyer from putting up the full purchase price of the stock by using the securities as collateral for a loan. The buyer obtained full benefit of ownership in rising stock valuation, but the loan amount remained the same. People swarmed to buy stock on margin. In the early 1920s, brokers' loans used to finance purchases on margin averaged 1–1.5 billion but by November 1928 had reached six billion. By the end of 1928, the interest on such loans was yielding 12% to lenders which led to a flood of gold converging on Wall St. from all over the world to fuel the purchase of stocks on margin.

== Aftermath of the crash ==
In the wake of Black Tuesday, London newspapers reported that ruined speculators were throwing themselves from windows but Galbraith asserts there was no substance to these claims of widespread suicides. Embezzlement now came to the fore. During the bubble, there was a net increase of what Galbraith calls "psychic wealth"; the person being robbed was unaware of their loss whilst the embezzler was materially improved. With the bursting of the bubble, accounts were now more closely scrutinized and reports of defaulting employees became a daily occurrence after the first week of the crash. The looting of the Union Industrial Bank became the most spectacular embezzlement of the period. Unknown to each other, several of the bank's officers began making away with funds for speculation. Over a period of time, they became aware of each other's activities and unable to expose each other entered into a cooperative venture which in time came to include all of the principal officers of the bank. They took a short position just as the market "soared into the blue yonder of the summer sky"; so costly was this to the group that they took a long position just before the crash and this was to prove a mortal blow.

== The influence of the Wall Street crash on the Great Depression ==
Contrary to what had been Wall Street's perceived tendency in playing down its influence, Galbraith asserted the important contribution of the 1929 crash on the Great Depression which followed: causing a contraction of demand for goods, destroying for a time the normal means of investment and lending, arresting economic growth and causing financial hardship which alienated many from the economic system. Galbraith further argues that the Great Depression was caused by a mixture of five main weaknesses:

First, an imbalance in the income distribution. Galbraith asserts that "the 5 per cent of the population with the highest incomes in that year [1929] received approximately one third of all personal income." Personal income in the form of rents, dividends, and interest of the well-to-do was approximately twice as much as in the period following the Second World War, leaving the economy dependent on a high level of investment and luxury consumer spending, and vulnerable to the stock market crash.

Second, problems in the structure of corporations. Most specifically, he cites newly formed investment entities of the era (such as holding companies and investment trusts) as contributing to a deflationary spiral, due in no small part to their high reliance on leverage. Dividends paid the interest on the bonds in the holding companies, and when these were interrupted, the structure collapsed. "It would be hard to imagine a corporate system better designed to continue and accentuate a deflationary cycle." Also, "The fact was that American enterprise in the twenties had opened its hospitable arms to an exceptional number of promoters, grafters, swindlers, impostors, and frauds. This, in the long history of such activities, was a kind of flood tide of corporate larceny."

Third, the bad banking structure. The weakness was manifest in the large number of units working independently. As one failed, pressure was applied to another, leading to a domino effect accelerated by increasing unemployment and lower incomes.

Fourth, foreign trade imbalances. During World War I, the US became a creditor nation, exporting more than it imported. High tariffs on imports contributed to this imbalance. Subsequent defaults by foreign governments led to a decline in exports, which was especially hard on farmers.

And finally, "the poor state of economic intelligence." Galbraith says that the "economists and those who offered economic counsel in the late twenties and early thirties were almost uniquely perverse" and that "the burden of reputable economic advice was invariably on the side of measures that would make things worse."

== Prospects for recurrence ==
Galbraith was of the opinion that the Great Crash had burned itself so deeply into the national consciousness that America had been spared another bubble up to the present time (1954).; however he thought the chances of another speculative orgy which characterized the 1929 crash as rather good as he felt the American people remained susceptible to the conviction that unlimited rewards were to be had and that they individually were meant to share in it. He considered the sense of responsibility in the financial community for the wider community as a whole as not being small but "nearly nil". Even though government powers were available to prevent a recurrence of a bubble their use was not attractive or politically expedient since an election is in the offing even on the day after an election.

== Reception and popular culture ==
In 2008 and 2009, Jim Cramer took to waving John Kenneth Galbraith's book, and praising it on his show Mad Money. He has been struck by the similarities between the crash described by Galbraith and the crash occurring in the Late 2000s recession.

== Revisions and updates ==
Revised editions of the book, each time with updated research and a more timely version of the introduction, were published in 1961, 1972, 1988, 1997 and 2009.

== See also ==
- Debt deflation
- Financial Instability Hypothesis

== Reference works ==
Galbraith, J.K, The Great Crash 1929, Pelican, 1961
