= China's Economy =

2016 non-fiction book by Arthur R. Kroeber

China's Economy: What Everyone Needs To Know
- Author: Arthur R. Kroeber
- Language: English
- Publisher: Oxford University Press
- Publication date: 2016
- Dewey Decimal: 330.951
- LC Class: HC427.95 .K76

China's Economy: What Everyone Needs To Know is a 2016 book by American author Arthur R. Kroeber, and part of the Oxford University Press series 'What Everyone Needs To Know'. The book provides a broad overview of the rise of China's economy.

== About ==
Economic reform must come first, and political reform–if ever–a distance second [...] "Development is the only Iron Law".

— Chp 1, China's Economy: What Everyone Needs To Know

The book starts with the initiation of modern economic reforms in China starting with Deng Xiaoping in 1979 and his prioritization of development over politics, conveyed as "Development is the only Iron Law". The chapters of the book go on to cover - agriculture and the rural economy, industry, urbanization, infrastructure, state-owned and private enterprises, the financial system, demographics, the labor market, inequality and corruption. The personalities and institutions in China that have led to its economic growth are discussed as well as the reforms that have worked, such as the 'de-collectivization of agriculture' into family farming, what would eventually become the single most important cause in the decrease in China's poverty levels from 84% in 1981 to 6% in 2011. The book provides an overview of the structure of the country as a decentralized bureaucratic-authoritarianism.

The book also compares China to China's neighbourhood, Japan, South Korea, Taiwan, which have also deeply influenced China's growth, with some major differences such as the level of influence of the United States on policy. Many of the fears related to China's economic growth, such as a prospective property crash, are overstated. The book also analyzes what the future holds for China, how Xi Jinping seems to be reinforcing his political strength, which may cause troubles to China's economy in the future. The Sinica Podcast says that the book is a "refreshing antidote to much of the commentary in the media", the "conventional wisdom" related to China.
