= New Socialism =

New Socialism may refer to:

- Neosocialism, a French political movement in the 1930s–40s
- Digital socialism, a form of socialism advocated in the 1993 book Towards a New Socialism
- A policy advocated in the 1973 book Economics and the Public Purpose
- Ideologies supported by various political parties and movements:
  - For a New Socialism, a Russian political movement
  - Communist Party of the Russian Federation
  - A Just Russia – For Truth
  - Movimiento al Socialismo (Venezuela)
  - Janatha Vimukthi Peramuna

== See also ==
- Welfare spending
- Affirmative action
