= Economics and the Public Purpose =

1973 book by John Kenneth Galbraith

- First edition
- Author: John Kenneth Galbraith
- Publisher: Houghton Mifflin
- Publication date: 1973

Economics and the Public Purpose is a 1973 book by Harvard economist John Kenneth Galbraith. It revises and synthesizes concepts introduced in three of his earlier works – American Capitalism (1952), The Affluent Society (1958), and The New Industrial State (1967) – with significant updates.

Galbraith advocates a "new socialism" as a solution, nationalising military production and public services such as health care. He also advocates introducing disciplined wage, salary, profit and price controls on the economy to reduce inequality and restrain the power of giant corporations. Socialisation of the "unduly weak industries and unduly strong ones" together with planning for the remainder would allow the public interest to be accorded its rightful preference, argues Galbraith, over private interests. He adds that this can only be achieved when there is a new belief system that rejects the orthodoxy of economics in the past. The new socialism needs to be achieved through gradual democratic political change.

== See also ==
- History of economic thought
- Social democracy
- Democratic socialism
- Liberal socialism
