= Catherine Galbraith =

American author (1913–2008)

Catherine Galbraith (née Catherine Merriam Atwater; January 19, 1913 – October 1, 2008) was an American author who was the wife of economist and author John Kenneth Galbraith, and the mother of four sons: diplomat and political analyst, Peter W. Galbraith, economist James K. Galbraith, attorney J. Alan Galbraith, and Douglas Galbraith who died in childhood of leukemia.

== Life and career ==
Catherine, also known as Kitty, was born in New York City, New York, the daughter of Alice Caroline (née Merriam) and Charles Woodard Atwater, a lawyer who later served as the Consul General for Siam and the granddaughter of Wilbur Olin Atwater, the inventor of the calorimeter and chemist known for his studies of human metabolism and nutrition.

Galbraith attended Smith College, spending her junior year at the Sorbonne, and obtaining her bachelor's degree in Romance languages from Smith in 1934. She then took graduate courses in German language at the Ludwig-Maximilians-Universität München, where she lived in the same rooming house-dormitory as Unity Mitford, a girlfriend of Adolf Hitler. She was awarded a Master of Arts degree from Radcliffe College in 1936. Galbraith was fluent in Hindi and several other languages.

She was introduced to her future husband (known to family and friends as Ken Galbraith) at a café while she was a graduate student at Radcliffe. The couple married on September 17, 1937, at the Reformed Church of North Hempstead, New York. The newlyweds were to sail on the MV Britannic to London, where Ken had planned to spend the year as a research fellow at the University of Cambridge studying under economist John Maynard Keynes, but Keynes was struck with a heart attack. Instead, Kitty introduced Ken to Europe, driving through the countryside, and visiting towns and cathedrals.

Before World War II, she worked as a researcher at both the Library of Congress and the United States Department of Justice.

Her son James wrote an essay while in fourth grade about the work his parents did, which included a detailed description of his father's job and concluded that "Mother doesn't do much". In response, Galbraith wrote an article in the May 1963 issue of The Atlantic Monthly, entitled "'Mother Doesn't Do Much': The Ambassador's Wife in India", describing her role in running the household and entertaining distinguished guests.

She co-authored a book India; Now and Through Time with Rama Mehta, the wife of an Indian diplomat in 1972, which was intended to introduce children ages 10–14 to the culture and life of India. The book includes personal anecdotes as well as photographs, and was described by Joseph Lelyveld of The New York Times as a "graceful and accurate book" that makes the reader wish for more stories.

For more than two decades, the Galbraiths held an annual party after the Harvard University commencement that often included Nobel Prize laureates and heads of state. Benazir Bhutto visited the Galbraiths during her freshman year at Harvard in 1969 and was a guest when she gave the commencement address in 1989.

Galbraith died at age 95 on October 1, 2008, of a heart attack at Mount Auburn Hospital. Her husband had died in 2006 at age 97, the two having been married 68 years.
