= The Nature of Mass Poverty =

1979 book by John Kenneth Galbraith

- First edition
- Author: John Kenneth Galbraith
- Language: English
- Genre: Non-fiction
- Publisher: Harvard University Press
- Publication date: 1979
- Publication place: United States
- ISBN: 0-674-60533-0

The Nature of Mass Poverty is an economics book by John Kenneth Galbraith published in 1979, in which Galbraith draws on his experiences as ambassador to India to explain the causes for and solutions to poverty. He begins by differentiating so-called "case poverty" of individuals (as detailed years earlier in The Affluent Society) from "mass poverty", largely observed in rural areas of the developing world.

Galbraith discusses a variety of different explanations for poverty, e.g. climate, mountains, access to harbours, raw materials, culture or political system. A typical example is his comparison of two train journeys in eastern Europe in 1860 and 1960. He points out that the effect of communism on economics was rather limited—the train basically being the same, the relative differences in economic status kept unchanged as well, (eastern) Germany and Czechoslovakia leading and Romania being the last. The same applies to Asia, where "being Chinese" had a greater effect on local wealth than climate or local political system.

Galbraith then lays out two arguments with regard to mass poverty. First, he contends that many of the causes attributed to the conditions of the rural poor (governmental corruption, lack of education) are in fact both a cause and effect of poverty. The poor being perfectly adapted to their labour-intensive work, an accommodation to poverty makes this culturally ingrained and the poor and their offspring tend to stay in that vicious circle. Galbraith points out that most solutions to poverty from the West (capital investment, improved organization and technology, increased agricultural production) are those the developed nations can provide—but often fail to consider local accommodation to poverty (compare Axelle Kabou).

Drawing on his observations in postwar Western Germany, which faced an enormous number of displaced persons after the war, he concludes that emigration was not a problem but in combination with the high level of education, it contributed significantly to the economic success and reconstruction effort. Galbraith recommends for India improvement in general education on the one hand and focused help for those determined to escape the cycle of poverty. In general, as for developed countries, emigration and embracing other cultures are not seen as a problem but a sign of action and willingness to escape unsustainable status.

The more literate and informed a population, the more influences and cultures they have available as role models, and the more motivated its members are to escape perpetual poverty. His primary Indian example is the Punjab region, a crossroads of trade and different cultural influences where the ambition to maintain high levels of literacy and education and the local mixture of Sikh, Hindu, and Muslim cultures accelerated economic growth relative to poorer southern provinces.
