= James K. Galbraith =

American economist (born 1952)

James Galbraith
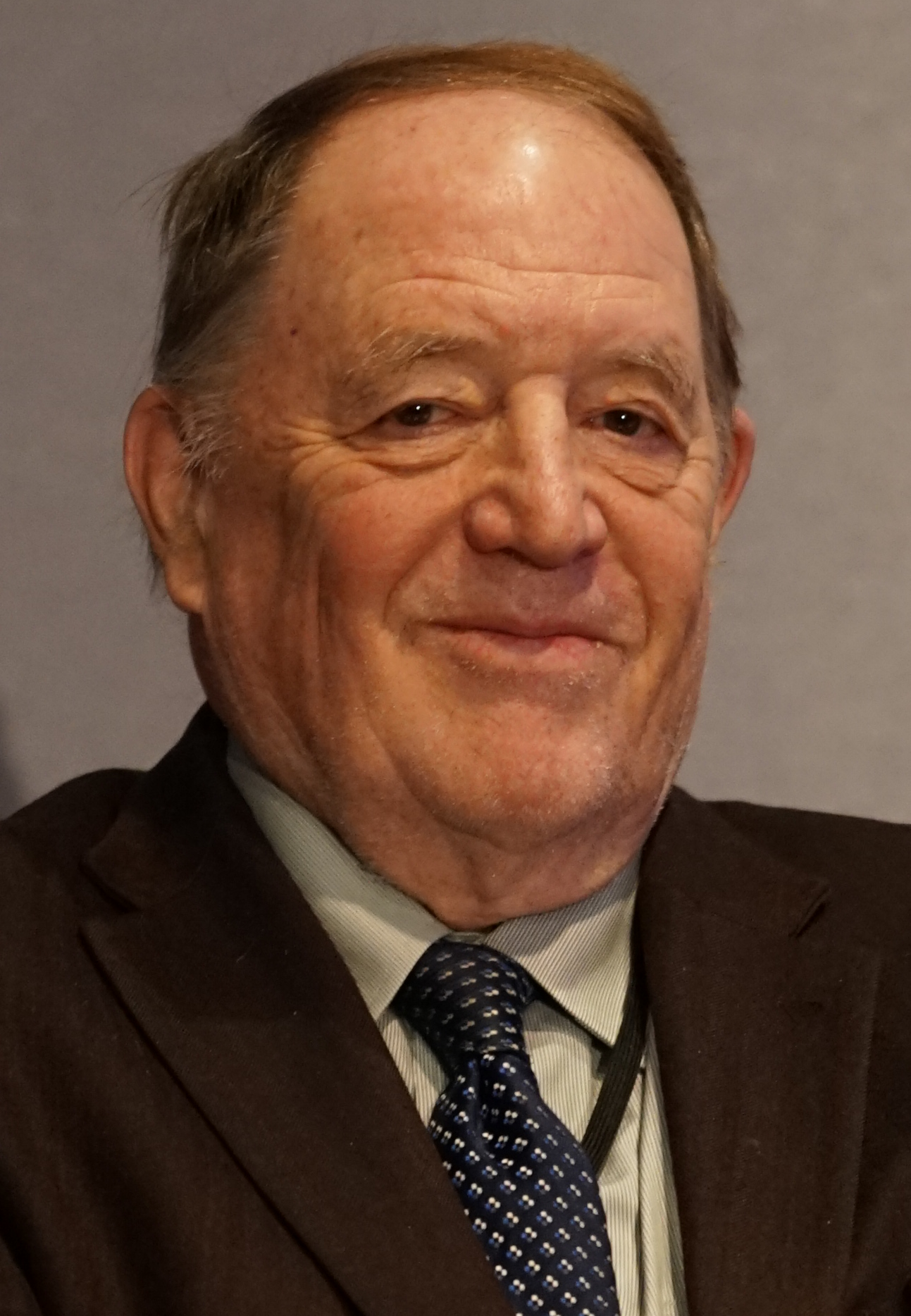
- Galbraith at ASSA 2026
- Born: James Kenneth Galbraith; January 29, 1952 (age 74)
- Spouse: Ying Tang
- Parents: Catherine Galbraith; John Kenneth Galbraith

Academic background
- Education: Harvard University (BA); Yale University (PhD)
- Thesis: A Theory of the Government Budget Process (1981)
- Influences: John Kenneth Galbraith

Academic work
- Discipline: Economics
- School or tradition: Post-Keynesian economics
- Institutions: University of Texas at Austin

James Kenneth Galbraith (born January 29, 1952) is an American economist. He is a professor at the Lyndon B. Johnson School of Public Affairs and at the Department of Government, University of Texas at Austin.

He is also a Senior Scholar with the Levy Economics Institute of Bard College and part of the executive committee of the World Economics Association, created in 2011.

== Background ==
Galbraith is a son of the renowned Canadian-American economist John Kenneth Galbraith and Catherine Galbraith (née Catherine Merriam Atwater), and is the brother of the former diplomat, commentator and 2016 Vermont gubernatorial candidate Peter W. Galbraith. He earned his B.A., magna cum laude, from Harvard College in 1974 and Ph.D. from Yale University in 1981, both in economics. From 1974 to 1975, Galbraith studied as a Marshall Scholar at King's College, Cambridge.

== Career ==
From 1981 to 1982, Galbraith served on the staff of the Congress of the United States, eventually as executive director of the Joint Economic Committee. In 1985, he was a guest scholar at the Brookings Institution.

Galbraith is a professor at the Lyndon B. Johnson School of Public Affairs and at the Department of Government, University of Texas at Austin. Galbraith heads up the University of Texas Inequality Project (UTIP), which has been described by economic historian Lord Skidelsky as "pioneering inequality measurement". UTIP promotes the Theil index over the Gini coefficient as a measurement for comparing inequality between groups, regions and countries. In 2005 UTIP introduced the Estimated Household Income Inequality (EHII) dataset, a panel of estimated Gini coefficients providing comparable measures of income inequality across many countries and years, derived from the project’s estimates of manufacturing pay inequality.

In March 2008, Galbraith used the 25th Annual Milton Friedman Distinguished Lecture to launch a sweeping attack on the Washington Consensus on free market policies, especially the monetarist version. He argued strongly that Keynesian economics offered a solution to the 2008 financial crisis, whereas monetarist policies would deepen the recession. Towards the end of 2008 and into 2009, many policymakers around the world increased government spending and/or cut taxes, arguably in line with Galbraith's views, as part of the Keynesian resurgence described by the Financial Times as "a stunning reversal of the orthodoxy of the past several decades".

In 2010, Galbraith edited an edition of his father's works for the Library of America series. He was interviewed for the 2021 JFK Revisited: Through the Looking Glass documentary.

== Writings ==
Galbraith's books include Balancing Acts: Technology, Finance and the American Future, 1989; Created Unequal: The Crisis in American Pay, 1998; Inequality and Industrial Change: A Global View, 2001, co-edited with Maureen Berner; and The Predator State, 2008. He is the author of two textbooks – The Economic Problem (with Robert L. Heilbroner) and Macroeconomics (with William Darity Jr.) He also contributes a column to The Texas Observer and writes regularly for The Nation, The American Prospect, Mother Jones, and The Progressive. His op-ed pieces have appeared in The New York Times, The Washington Post, Boston Globe and other newspapers. Galbraith argues that modern America has fallen prey to a wealthy, government-controlling "predatory class". He said:

Today, the signature of modern American capitalism is neither benign competition, nor class struggle, nor an inclusive middle-class utopia. Instead, predation has become the dominant feature — a system wherein the rich have come to feast on decaying systems built for the middle class. The predatory class is not the whole of the wealthy; it may be opposed by many others of similar wealth. But it is the defining feature, the leading force. And its agents are in full control of the government under which we live.

Galbraith is highly critical of the George W. Bush administration's foreign policy apropos of the 2003 invasion of Iraq. He stated:

There is a reason for the vulnerability of empires. To maintain one against opposition requires war — steady, unrelenting, unending war. And war is ruinous — from a legal, moral and economic point of view. It can ruin the losers, such as Napoleonic France, or Imperial Germany in 1918. And it can ruin the victors, as it did the British and the Soviets in the 20th century. Conversely, Germany and Japan recovered well from World War II, in part because they were spared reparations and did not have to waste national treasure on defense in the aftermath of defeat... The real economic cost of Bush's empire building is twofold: It diverts attention from pressing economic problems at home and it sets the United States on a long-term imperial path that is economically ruinous.

Much like his father in writing A Tenured Professor, the junior Galbraith is a critic of his own profession. He wrote:

Leading active members of today's economics profession, the generation presently in their 40s and 50s, have joined together into a kind of politburo for correct economic thinking. As a general rule — as one might expect from a gentleman's club — this has placed them on the wrong side of every important policy issue, and not just recently but for decades. They predict disaster where none occurs. They deny the possibility of events that then happen. They offer a "rape is like the weather" fatalism about an "inevitable" problem (pay inequality) that then starts to recede. They oppose the most basic, decent, and sensible reforms, while offering placebos instead. They are always surprised when something untoward (like a recession) actually occurs. And when finally they sense that some position cannot be sustained, they do not re-examine their ideas. Instead, they simply change the subject.

== Humanitarian initiatives ==
Galbraith is the chairman of Economists for Peace and Security, formerly known as Economists Against the Arms Race and later Economists Allied for Arms Reduction (ECAAR), an international association of professional economists concerned with peace and security issues. In 2009, he joined the project Soldiers of Peace, a documentary for global peace and against all wars, which has won various awards in film festivals.

== Books ==
- Galbraith, James Kenneth (2026), The Power to Destroy: How Bad Economics Drove America’s Decline, University of Chicago Press, ISBN 9780226827155.
- Galbraith, James Kenneth; Chen, Jing (2025), Entropy Economics: The Living Basis of Value and Production, University of Chicago Press, ISBN 9780226837840.
- Galbraith, James Kenneth (2016), Welcome to the Poisoned Chalice: The Destruction of Greece and the Future of Europe, Yale University Press, ISBN 978-0300-22044-5.
- Galbraith, James Kenneth (2014), The End of Normal: The Great Crisis and the Future of Growth, Simon & Schuster, ISBN 978-1-4516-4492-0.
- Galbraith, James Kenneth (2012), Inequality and Instability: A Study of the World Economy Just Before the Great Crisis, Oxford University Press, ISBN 978-0-19-985565-0.
- Galbraith, John Kenneth (2010), Galbraith, James K (ed.), The Affluent Society and Other Writings 1952–1967, New York: The Library of America, ISBN 978-1-59853-077-3.
- Galbraith, James Kenneth (2008), The Predator State.
- Galbraith, James Kenneth; Berner, Maureen, eds. (2001), Inequality and Industrial Change: A Global View, Cambridge University Press
- Galbraith, James Kenneth (1998), Created Unequal: The Crisis in American Pay
- Galbraith, James Kenneth; Darity, William Jr. (1993), Macroeconomics, Houghton Mifflin College Div, ISBN 978-0395522417.
- Galbraith, James Kenneth; Heilbroner, Robert L (1989), The Economic Problem, Pearson College Div, ISBN 978-0132251945.
- Galbraith, James Kenneth (1989), Balancing Acts: Technology, Finance and the American Future.
