= Countervailing power =

Political theory of beneficial opposing forces

Countervailing power, or countervailance, is the idea in political theory which suggests that the wielding of power by two or more groups, centers, or sets of interests within a polity can, and often does, yield beneficial effects through productive opposition and containment between opposing forces. As a political concept, it resembles those of agonism, agonistic pluralism, and checks and balances, encapsulated in the often-quoted phrase from Federalist No. 51 that "ambition must be made to counteract ambition". The notion of countervailance has been applied in both politics and economics.

== Political theory ==
In political theory, countervailance dates back at least to Medieval times, especially in reformist Roman Catholic and early Protestant movements. The Conciliar Movement, although ultimately ending in failure to reform the Catholic Church, "raised issues that are fundamental in all domains of social organization, and it contributed to the understanding of the general principle of countervailance, which eventually became the foundation of modern constitutionalism." The constitutional organization of government, which implies moderation achieved through countervailing forces, stands in contrast to polities where power is concentrated, unchecked, and can be used despotically. Examples of the latter include principalities where "various princes were absolute rulers in their domain", absolutist monarchies, and modern authoritarian and totalitarian governments.

17th-century England was an important setting for the development of countervailance theory. It was during this period that "the operational dynamics of the system developed in accordance with the countervailance model of government." While the trend reversed somewhat under the power of Oliver Cromwell and the era of the later Stuarts, and was therefore rather uneven over the flow of the 17th century, the Glorious Revolution of 1688 "firmly established the principles of dispersed power and checks and balances as the central pillars of English constitutionalism."

Contemporary research in political science and constitutionalism emphasizes the importance of countervailance for democratization and democratic stability. A 2021 study found that power dispersion and countervailance during constitution-making encourages the development of institutions that protect opposition parties from arbitrary use of executive power without unduly impairing majority rule, thus fostering democracy.

== Economic usage ==
In economics, the famous American economist John Kenneth Galbraith developed the concept of "Countervailing Power" in his 1952 book American Capitalism to refer to the political regulation of markets. In the classic liberal economy, goods and services are provided and prices set by free bargaining between isolated individual agents. According to Galbraith, however, large business corporations wield enormous power to bias market processes in modern economies. 'Countervailing' powers in the form of trade unions, citizens' organizations and others are crucial to offset business's excessive advantage. On page 126 of his book, Galbraith elaborates on countervailing power in the sphere of economics when he states:

"The development of countervailing power requires a certain minimum opportunity and capacity for organization, corporate or otherwise. If the large retail buying organizations had not developed the countervailing power which they have used, by proxy, on behalf of the individual consumer, consumers would have been faced with the need to organize the equivalent of the retailer's power. This would have been a formidable task but it has been accomplished in Scandinavia where the consumer's co-operative, instead of the chain store, is the dominant instrument of countervailing power in consumers' goods markets."

== See also ==
- Separation of powers
