= Daniel Bromley =

American economist

Daniel W. Bromley
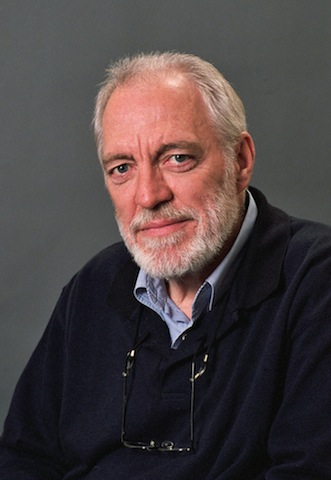
- Born: Daniel W. Bromley; March 27, 1940 (age 86); Phoenix, Arizona, United States

Academic background
- Education: Oregon State University

Academic work
- Discipline: Institutional economics
- School or tradition: Institutional economics
- Institutions: University of Wisconsin
- Awards: Reimar Lüst Prize (2011); Fellow American Agricultural Economics Association; Fellow Association of Environmental and Resource Economists; Veblen-Commons Award Association for Evolutionary Economics (2016)

Daniel W. Bromley (born 1940) is an economist, the former Anderson-Bascom Professor of applied economics at the University of Wisconsin–Madison, and since 2009, Emeritus Professor. His research in institutional economics explains the foundations of property rights, natural resources and the environment; and economic development. He was the editor of the journal Land Economics from 1974 until 2018.

== Early life and education ==
Bromley graduated from Utah State University in 1963 with a degree in Ecology. He then received an M.S. (1967) and PhD (1969) in natural resource economics from Oregon State University, where his major professor was Emery Castle.

== Career ==
Bromley began working as a professor at the University of Wisconsin-Madison in 1969 and retired after 40 years. He served two terms as chair of the Department of Agricultural and Applied Economics in the University of Wisconsin–Madison College of Agricultural and Life Sciences. In 2014 he published Wisconsin Becoming: The Careful Creation of Prosperity, which covers the history of the Department of Agricultural and Applied Economics and its relation to economic development in the state of Wisconsin.

Since 2009, Bromley has been a visiting professor at the Faculty of Agriculture and Horticulture of the Humboldt University of Berlin, Germany. In 2011 he was honored with the Reinhard-Lust-Preis for International Transfer of Science and Culture awarded jointly by the German Alexander von Humboldt-Stiftung and the Fritz Thyssen-Stiftung.

For three years, Bromley served Chair of the U. S. Federal Advisory Committee on Marine Protected Areas. Bromley also served on a special committee of the National Academy of Sciences on climate change in the United States. Bromley is a consultant, advising the Global Environment Facility, the World Bank, the Ford Foundation, the U.S. Agency for International Development, the Asian Development Bank, the Organisation for Economic Co-operation and Development, the Ministry for the Environment in New Zealand, and the Aga Khan Foundation. His has consulted with the Government of National Unity in Sudan on economic recovery in the south and in Darfur and the government of Jordan on institutional reform in the water sector.

In 2016, Juha Hiedanpää and Bromley published Environmental Heresies: The Quest for Reasonable, which reframes environmental conflicts and which advances a pragmatic, deliberative approach.

== Contributions to economics ==
Bromley has been the editor of the journal Land Economics for more than 41 years. His scholarship has been concerned with more effective fisheries, economic development, and environmental policy. In an influential article, "The ideology of efficiency: Searching for a Theory of Policy Analysis", Bromley challenged conventional notions that economic efficiency analysis is "objective", finding an absence of consistency and coherence in the logical positivism of economic welfare analysis.

In the 2006 book, Sufficient Reason: Volitional Pragmatism and the Meaning of Economic Institutions, Bromley challenged the prevailing economic microeconomic models of rational choice; he offered a competing evolutionary model of pragmatic human action where individuals "work out" their desired choices and actions as they learn what choices are available. Bromley's perspective on volitional pragmatism builds on the philosophical and institutional economics work of Ludwig Wittgenstein, Friedrich Nietzsche, Charles Sanders Peirce, John Dewey, John R. Commons, Thorstein Veblen, and Richard Rorty.

== Awards ==
- Fellow (1992) American Agricultural Economics Association
- Fellow (2007) Association of Environmental and Resource Economists
- Reimar Lüst Prize from the Alexander von Humboldt Foundation (2011), Germany
- Veblen-Commons Award (2016) from the Association for Evolutionary Economics

== Selected works ==
=== Books ===
- Economic Interests and Institutions: The Conceptual Foundations of Public Policy. Oxford: Blackwell, 1989.
- Environment and Economy: Property Rights and Public Policy. Oxford: Blackwell, 1991.
- Making the Commons Work: Theory, Practice, and Policy. (ed.), San Francisco: ICS Press, 1992.
- Handbook of Environmental Economics. (ed.) Oxford: Blackwell, 1995.
- Sustaining Development: Environmental Resources in Developing Countries. Cheltenham, UK: Elgar, 1999.
- Economics, Ethics, and Environmental Policy: Contested Choices. (ed.) Oxford: Blackwell, 2002. (with Juoni Paavola)
- Sufficient Reason: Volitional Pragmatism and the Meaning of Economic Institutions. Princeton: Princeton University Press, 2006.
- Vulnerable People, Vulnerable States: Redefining the Development Challenge. London: Routledge, 2012. (with Glen Anderson)
- Institutions and the Environment. (ed.) Cheltenham: Edward Elgar, 2014.
- Environmental Heresies: The Quest for Reasonable. London: Palgrave Macmillan, 2016. (with Juha Hiedanpää)
- Possessive Individualism: A Crisis of Capitalism. Oxford: Oxford University Press, 2019.
- Assuring the Future of South Sudan: Coherent Governance and Sustainable Livelihoods. Africa World Books, 2020. (with Lual A. Deng, Santiono Ayuel Longar, Bishop (Emeritus) Enock Tombe Stephen)

=== Articles ===
- "The Village Against the Center: Resource Depletion in South Asia". American Journal of Agricultural Economics, 66(5):868–873 (1984). (with Devendra P. Chapagain).
- "Property Relations and Economic Development: The Other Land Reform". World Development, 17(6):867-77 (June 1989).
- "Private Property Rights and Presumptive Policy Entitlements: Reconsidering the Premises of Rural Policy". European Review of Agricultural Economics, 17:197–214 (Spring 1990). (with Ian Hodge)
- "Property Rights, Externalities, and Resource Degradation: Locating the Tragedy," Journal of Development Economics, 33(2): 235–62, 1990. (with Bruce Larson)
- "The Ideology of Efficiency: Searching for a Theory of Policy Analysis". Journal of Environmental Economics and Management, 19(1):86–107 (July 1990).
- "The Commons, Common Property, and Environmental Policy". Environmental and Resource Economics, 2:1–17 (1992).
- "Regulatory Takings: Coherent Concept or Logical Contradiction". Vermont Law Review, 17(3):647-82 (1993).
- "Choices Without Prices Without Apologies". Journal of Environmental Economics and Management, 26(2):129-48 (March 1994). (with Arild Vatn)
- "Externalities: A Market Model Failure". Environmental and Resource Economics, 9:135-51 (1997). (with Arild Vatn)
- "Indigenous Land Rights in Sub-Saharan Africa: Appropriation, Security and Investment Demand". World Development, 25(4):549-62 (1997). (with Espen Sjaastad)
- "Constitutional Political Economy: Property Claims in a Dynamic World". Contemporary Economic Policy, 15(4):43–54 (October 1997).
- "Modeling Population and Resource Scarcity in 14th Century England". Journal of Agricultural Economics, 56(2):217-37 (2005). (with Jean-Paul Chavas).
- "Volitional Pragmatism". Ecological Economics, 68:1–13 (2008).
- "Resource Degradation in the African Commons: Accounting for Institutional Decay". Environment and Development Economics, 13(5):539-63, 2008.
- "Formalising Property Relations in the Developing World: The Wrong Prescription for the Wrong Malady". Land Use Policy, 26(1):20–27 (2009).
- "Abdicating Responsibility: The Deceits of Fisheries Policy". Fisheries, 34(6):280-90 (2009).
- "Volitional Pragmatism: The Collective Construction of Rules to Live By". The Pluralist, 10(1):6–23 (2015).
- "Where is the Backward Russian peasant? Evidence against the superiority of private farming, 1883–1913". Journal of Peasant Studies, 42(2):425-47 (2015) (with Michael Kopsidis and Katja Bruisch).
- "The French Revolution and German Industrialization: Dubious Models and Doubtful Causality". Journal of Institutional Economics, 12(1):161–190 (2016). (with Michael Kopsidis).
- "Institutional Economics". Journal of Economic Issues, 50(2, June):309-325 (2016).
- "Rights-Based Fisheries and Contested Claims of Ownership: Some Necessary Clarifications". Marine Policy, 72(October):231–236 (2016).
- "Rationality and Fatalism: Meanings and Labels in Pre-Revolutionary Russia". Mind and Society, 20:103-05 (2021).
- "Opening Up is Not Showing Up: Human Volition after the Pandemic". Mind and Society, 20(2):195-99 (2021).
- "The Confusions of Democracy: The Arab Spring and Beyond". World Development, 158(October) (2022).
