= John Kenneth Galbraith =

Canadian-American economist and diplomat (1908–2006)

John Kenneth Galbraith OC
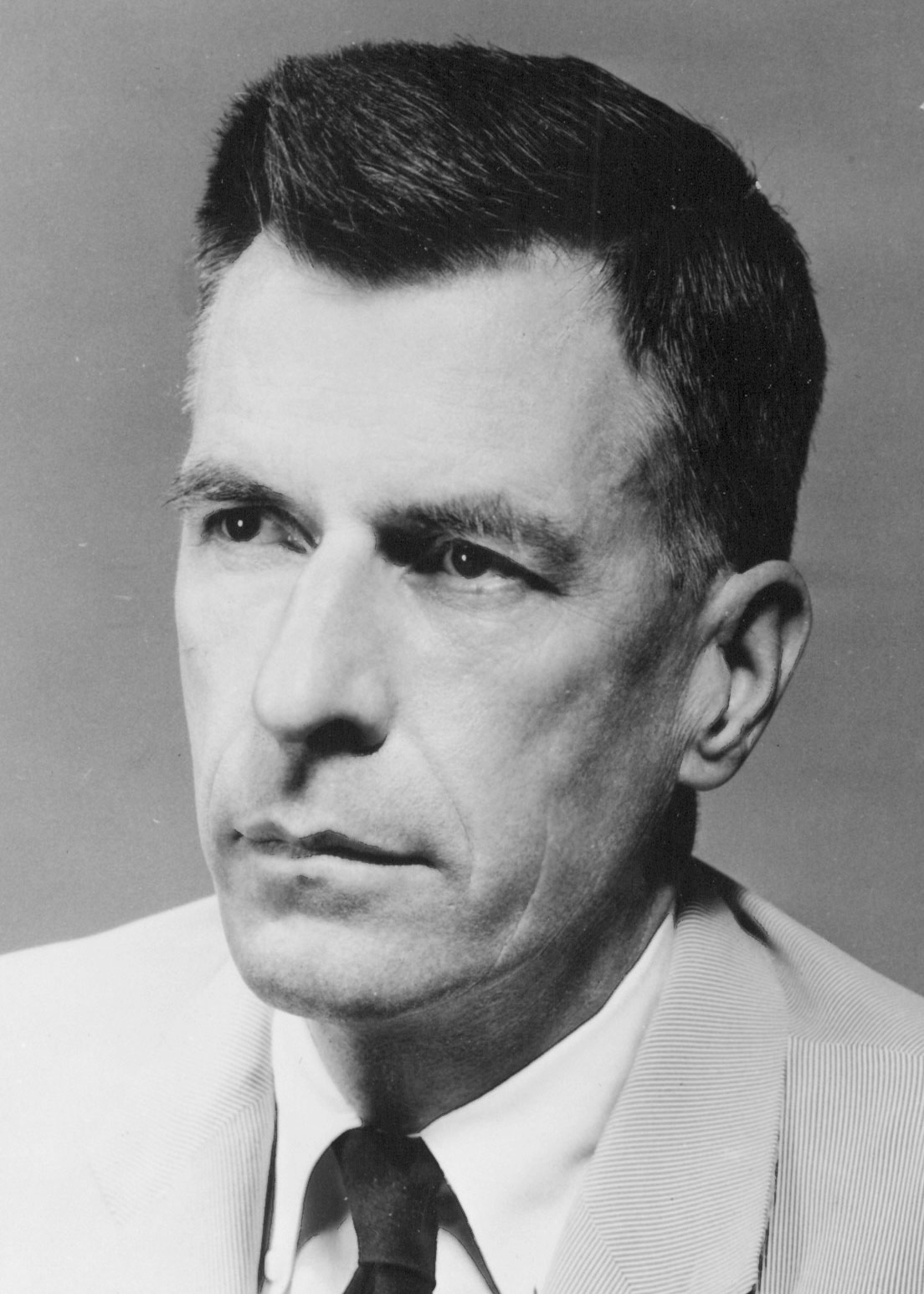
- Galbraith in 1958

7th United States Ambassador to India
- In office April 18, 1961 – July 12, 1963
- President: John F. Kennedy
- Preceded by: Ellsworth Bunker
- Succeeded by: Chester Bowles

Personal details
- Born: October 15, 1908 Iona Station, Ontario, Canada
- Died: April 29, 2006 (aged 97) Cambridge, Massachusetts, U.S.
- Citizenship: Canada; United States (from 1937)
- Spouse: Catherine Merriam Atwater (m. 1937)
- Children: 4, including Peter and James
- Education: Ontario Agricultural College (BSAg); University of California, Berkeley (MA, PhD)

Academic background
- Influences: Veblen; Smith; Marx; Keynes; Kalecki; Means; Berle

Academic work
- School or tradition: Institutional economics
- Institutions: Harvard University; Princeton University; University of California, Berkeley
- Notable ideas: Countervailing power; technostructure; conventional wisdom
- Awards: Lomonosov Gold Medal (1993); Officer of the Order of Canada (1997); Presidential Medal of Freedom (2000); Padma Vibhushan (2001)

John Kenneth Galbraith (Note: Pronounced /ɡælˈbreɪθ/ gal-BRAYTH.) (October 15, 1908 – April 29, 2006) was a Canadian-American economist, diplomat, public official, and intellectual. His books on economic topics were bestsellers from the 1950s through the 2000s. As an economist, he leaned toward post-Keynesian economics from an institutionalist perspective. He served as the deputy director of the powerful Office of Price Administration (OPA) during World War II in charge of stabilizing all prices, wages and rents in the American economy, to combat the threat of inflation and hoarding during a time of shortages and rationing, a task which was successfully accomplished.

Galbraith was a professor of economics at Harvard University for half a century. He was a prolific author and wrote four dozen books, including several novels, and published more than a thousand articles and essays on various subjects. Among his works was a trilogy on economics, American Capitalism (1952), The Affluent Society (1958), and The New Industrial State (1967).

Galbraith was active in Democratic Party politics, serving in the administrations of Franklin D. Roosevelt, Harry S. Truman, John F. Kennedy, and Lyndon B. Johnson. He served as United States Ambassador to India under the Kennedy administration. His political activism, literary output and outspokenness brought him wide fame during his lifetime. Galbraith was one of the few to receive both the World War II Medal of Freedom (1946) and the Presidential Medal of Freedom (2000) for his public service and contributions to science. During the Watergate scandal, Galbraith discovered that he had been placed on the master list of Nixon's political opponents.

== Life ==
=== Early life ===
Galbraith was born on October 15, 1908, to Canadians of Scottish descent, Sarah Catherine (Kendall) and Archibald "Archie" Galbraith, in Iona Station, Ontario, Canada, and was raised in Dunwich Township, Ontario. He had three siblings: Alice, Catherine, and Archibald William (Bill). By the time he was a teenager, he had adopted the name Ken, and later disliked being called John. Galbraith grew to be a very tall man, attaining a height of 6 feet 9 inches (206 cm).

His father was a farmer, school teacher, president of a cooperative insurance company, and local official of the Liberal Party. His mother, a homemaker and a community activist, died when he was fourteen years old. The family farm was located on Thomson Line. Both of his parents were supporters of the United Farmers of Ontario in the 1920s.

His early years were spent at a one-room school which is still standing, on 9468 Willey Road, in Iona Station. Later, he went to Dutton High School and St. Thomas High School. In 1931, Galbraith graduated with a Bachelor of Science in Agriculture from the Ontario Agricultural College, which was then an associate agricultural college of the University of Toronto. He majored in animal husbandry. He was awarded a Giannini Scholarship in Agricultural Economics (receiving $60 per month) that allowed him to travel to Berkeley, California, where he received masters and Doctor of Philosophy degrees in agricultural economics from the University of California, Berkeley. Galbraith was taught economics by Professor George Martin Peterson, and together they wrote an economics paper titled "The Concept of Marginal Land" in 1932 that was published in the American Journal of Agricultural Economics.

After graduation in 1934, he started to work as an instructor at Harvard University. Galbraith taught intermittently at Harvard in the period 1934 to 1939. From 1939 to 1940, he taught at Princeton University. In 1937, he became a citizen of the United States and was no longer a British subject. (Note: Canada did not have its own citizenship at the time, but later the United States and Canada acknowledged that their citizens, who had taken out citizenship in the others' countries, were recognized as having also retained their original citizenship, and Galbraith died as he had been born—a Canadian, although he had previously been amply honored as a Canadian as well as an American.) In the same year, he took a year-long fellowship at the University of Cambridge, England, where he was influenced by John Maynard Keynes. He then traveled in Europe for several months in 1938, attending an international economic conference and developing his ideas. He served for a few months in summer 1934 in the U.S. Department of Agriculture. As a Harvard teacher in 1938 he was given charge of a research project for the National Resources Planning Board. From 1943 until 1948, he served as an editor of Fortune magazine. In 1949, he was appointed professor of economics at Harvard. He also taught at the Harvard Extension School.

=== World War II ===
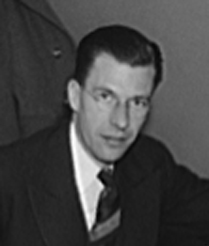
Photograph was taken between 1940 and 1946 "I react pragmatically. Where the market works, I'm for that. Where the government is necessary, I'm for that. I'm deeply suspicious of somebody who says, 'I'm in favor of privatization,' or, 'I'm deeply in favor of public ownership.' I'm in favor of whatever works in the particular case." — C-SPAN, November 13, 1994

The United States went into WWII with an economy still not fully recovered from the Great Depression. Because wartime production needs mandated large budget deficits and an accommodating monetary policy, inflation and a runaway wage-price spiral were seen as likely. As a part of a team charged with keeping inflation from damaging the war effort, Galbraith served as a deputy administrator of the Office of Price Administration (OPA) during World War II in 1941–1943. The OPA directed the process of stabilization of prices and rents.

On May 11, 1941, President Roosevelt created the Office of Price Administration and Civilian Supply (OPACS). On August 28, 1941, it became the Office of Price Administration (OPA). After the US entered the war in December 1941, OPA was tasked with rationing and price controls. The Emergency Price Control Act passed on January 30, 1942, legitimized the OPA as a separate federal agency. It merged OPA with two other agencies: Consumer Protection Division and Price Stabilization Division of the Advisory Commission to the Council of National Defense. The council was referred to as the National Defense Advisory Commission (NDAC), and was created on May 29, 1940. NDAC emphasized voluntary and advisory methods in keeping prices low. Leon Henderson, the NDAC commissioner for price stabilization, became the administrator of OPACS and of OPA in 1941–1942. He oversaw a mandatory and vigorous price regulation that started in May 1942 after OPA introduced the General Maximum Price Regulation (GMPR). It was much criticized by the business community. In response, OPA mobilized the public on behalf of the new guidelines and said that it reduced the options for those who were seeking higher rents or prices. OPA had its own Enforcement Division, which documented the increase of violations: a quarter million in 1943 and more than 300,000 during the next year.

Historians and economists differ over the assessment of the OPA activities, which started with six people, but then grew to 15,000 staffers. Some of them point to the fact that price increases were relatively lower than during the First World War, and that the overall economy grew faster. Steven Pressman, for example, wrote that "when the controls were removed there was only a small increase in prices, thereby demonstrating that inflationary pressures were actively managed and not just kept temporarily under control." Galbraith said in an interview that he considered his work at the OPA as his major life achievement, since prices were relatively stable during WWII. The role of the OPA, however, as well as the whole legacy of the US government wartime economic stabilization measures from a long-term perspective, remains debated. Richard Parker, who earlier had written a well regarded biography of Galbraith had this to say about Galbraith's efforts during the war:

[H]e had first gone to work in the nation's capital in 1934 as a 25-year-old, fresh out of graduate school and just about to join the Harvard faculty as a young instructor. He had returned to Washington in mid-1940, after Paris fell to the Germans, initially to help ready the nation for war. Eighteen months later, after Pearl Harbor, he was then appointed to oversee the wartime economy as "price czar," charged with preventing inflation and corrupt price-gouging from devastating the economy as it swelled to produce the weapons and materiel needed to guarantee victory against fascism. In this, he and his colleagues at the Office of Price Administration had been stunningly successful, guiding an economy that quadrupled in size in less than five years without fanning the inflation that had haunted World War I, or leaving behind an unbalanced post-war collapse of the kind that had done such grievous damage to Europe in the 1920s.

Opposition to the OPA came from conservatives in Congress and the business community. It undercut Galbraith and he was forced out in May 1943, accused of "communistic tendencies". He was promptly hired by Henry Luce, a conservative Republican and a dominant figure in American media as publisher of Time and Fortune magazines. Galbraith worked for Luce for five years and expounded Keynesianism to the American business leadership. Luce allegedly said to President Kennedy, "I taught Galbraith how to write—and have regretted it ever since." Galbraith saw his role as educating the entire nation on how the economy worked, including the role of big corporations. He was combining his writing with numerous speeches to business groups and local Democratic party meetings, as well as frequently testifying before Congress.

During the late stages of WWII in 1945, Galbraith was invited by Paul Nitze to serve as one of the "Officers" of the Strategic Bombing Survey, initiated by the Office of Strategic Services. It was designed to assess the results of the aerial bombardments of Nazi Germany. The survey found that German war production went up rather than down as German cities were being bombed. Henderson (2006) wrote, 'Galbraith had to fight hard to have his report published without it being rewritten to hide the essential points. "I defended it," he wrote, "with a maximum of arrogance and a minimum of tact."' Those findings created a controversy, with Nitze siding with others of the "Officers" managing the survey and with Pentagon officials, who declared the opposite. Later, Galbraith described the willingness of public servants and institutions to bend the truth to please the Pentagon as the "Pentagonania syndrome".

=== Postwar ===
In February 1946, Galbraith took a leave of absence from his magazine work for a senior position in the State Department as director of the Office of Economic Security Policy where he was nominally in charge of economic affairs regarding Germany, Japan, Austria, and South Korea. Distrusted by senior diplomats, he was relegated to routine work, with few opportunities to make policy. Galbraith favored détente with the Soviet Union, along with Secretary of State James F. Byrnes and General Lucius D. Clay, a military governor of the US Zone in Germany from 1947 to 1949, but they were out of step with the containment policy then being developed by George Kennan and favored by the majority of the US major policymakers. After a disconcerting half-year, Galbraith resigned in September 1946 and went back to his magazine writing on economics issues. Later, he immortalized his frustration with "the ways of Foggy Bottom" in a satirical novel, The Triumph (1968). The postwar period also was memorable for Galbraith because of his work, along with Eleanor Roosevelt and Hubert Humphrey, to establish a progressive policy organization Americans for Democratic Action (ADA) in support of the cause of economic and social justice in 1947. In 1952, Galbraith's friends Arthur M. Schlesinger Jr. and George Ball recruited him to work as a speechwriter for the Democratic candidate, Adlai Stevenson. The involvement of several intellectuals from the ADA in the Stevenson campaign attracted controversy as the Republican Senator Joseph McCarthy accused the ADA intellectuals as being "tainted" by "well documented Red associations"; Galbraith later said one of his regrets was that McCarthy failed to condemn him as one of Stevenson's "red" advisers.

=== Kennedy administration ===
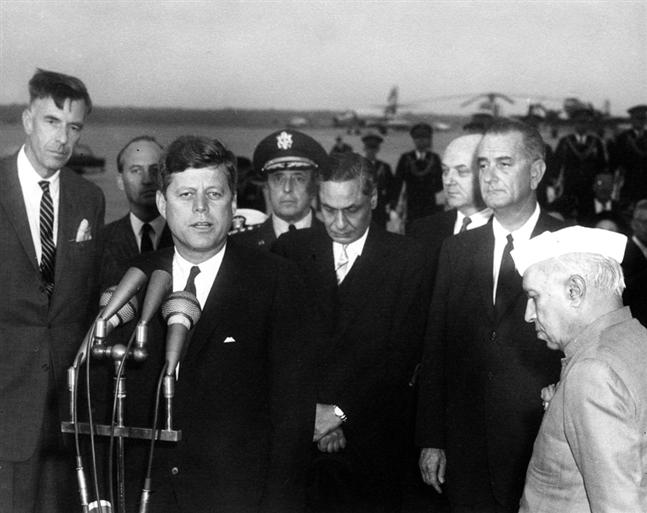
Galbraith at left, as US ambassador to India, with President John F. Kennedy, Vice-President Lyndon B. Johnson, and Prime Minister Jawaharlal Nehru of India, 1961

During his time as an adviser to President John F. Kennedy, Galbraith was appointed United States Ambassador to India from 1961 to 1963. His rapport with Kennedy was such that he regularly bypassed the State Department and sent his diplomatic cables directly to the president. Galbraith disliked his superior, Secretary of State Dean Rusk, writing to Kennedy that trying to communicate via Rusk was "like trying to fornicate through a mattress". In India, he became a confidant of Prime Minister Jawaharlal Nehru and extensively advised the Indian government on economic matters.

Kennedy considered India to be important not just in its own right, but also because an Indian diplomat always served as the chief commissioner of the International Control Commission (ICC). Thus, Galbraith came to be involved in American policy towards Southeast Asia from his perch as an ambassador in New Delhi. In 1961, when Kennedy considered intervening in the civil war in Laos, Galbraith strongly advised him not to, warning him that the disastrous Bay of Pigs Invasion had been caused by Kennedy taking the advice offered by the hawkish Joint Chiefs of Staff, who had assured him that the invasion could not fail and were now saying the same about the proposed intervention in Laos. Galbraith also noted that the ICC was also responsible for Laos as well as the two Vietnams, and he had Nehru's word that the Indian diplomats on the ICC were willing to serve as honest brokers for a peace deal to make Laos neutral in the Cold War.

In May 1961, the Indian ICC members had been able to broker a ceasefire in Laos and Kennedy decided to go for the neutralization option instead of war. During the talks in Geneva to discuss a solution to the Lao crisis, the chief American delegate, W. Averell Harriman, discovered the Chinese foreign minister, Chen Yi, was willing to meet him in private. However, Rusk forbade Harriman to talk to Chen under any circumstances, fearful of Republican attacks against the Democrat Kennedy if the meetings should come out to the media, causing Harriman to explode in rage that during World War II, Roosevelt had allowed him to meet whoever was necessary. Unable to change Rusk's mind, Harriman appealed to Galbraith, who in his turn appealed to Kennedy. Kennedy granted permission for Harriman to meet Chen, provided that it was done under the strictest secrecy, but by that time, Chen had returned to Beijing. In May 1961, when Vice President Lyndon Johnson visited India, Galbraith had the duty of escorting him around various sites in India and attempting to explain some of his Texas mannerisms such as his shouts of "yee-hah!" that he made when he saw the Taj Mahal, which confused the Indians.

From the embassy in New Delhi, Galbraith emerged as a critic of the increasing American involvement in Vietnam. In November 1961, he visited South Vietnam where he presented an unflattering picture of the regime of President Ngo Dinh Diem, saying "we are now married to failure". He advised finding a new South Vietnamese leader, saying "nothing succeeds like successors". In May 1962, Galbraith cabled Kennedy, stating that according to the most recent statements made by Secretary of Defense Robert McNamara, Diem had about 170,000 men under arms at present, while claiming that his country was in major danger from 20,000 lightly armed Viet Cong guerrillas. Galbraith proceeded to do a statistical comparison, under which he calculated that in proportional terms, Diem had an army that was approximately the ratio to the population that was equivalent to that of the U.S Army to the American people after the Civil War, while the Viet Cong had a ratio equivalent to that of the Sioux vs the American people, leading Galbraith to sarcastically ask why Diem needed more American support. He concluded his cable to Kennedy: "Incidentally, who is the man in your administration who decides what countries are strategic? I would like to have his name and address and ask him what is so important about this real estate in the Space Age".

In January 1963, when Polish Foreign Minister Adam Rapacki visited New Delhi, Galbraith met with him to declare to him his "despair" about Kennedy's Vietnam policies and to ask that Poland, as one of the three members of the ICC, try help find a diplomatic solution to the Vietnam War. Galbraith told Rapacki that he favored an agreement to neutralize the two Vietnams similar to the neutralization agreement signed for Laos in 1962. On February 5, 1963, Przemysław Ogrodziński, the Polish ambassador in New Delhi, was ordered by his superiors in Warsaw: "As far as the Vietnam matter, we are discussing it. It was received with interest. Deliberations will continue. As for now, we suggest inviting Galbraith to lunch and sounding [him] out, without committing ourselves, in order for him to see that we are looking into this matter".

Although Galbraith had acted on his own in approaching Rapacki, he had some support from Kennedy, who told him "to pursue the subject immediately." This was the origin of the "Maneli affair", named after Mieczysław Maneli, the Polish Commissioner to the ICC who, together with Ramchundur Goburdhun, the Indian Commissioner on the ICC, approached leaders in both North and South Vietnam with a proposal to make both Vietnams neutral in the Cold War.

On April 1, 1963, Galbraith flew to Washington to discuss the peace proposal with Kennedy, where the president told him "to be prepared to seize upon any favorable moment to reduce our commitment [in Vietnam]", though it "might yet be some time away." In September 1963, Maneli met with Ngô Đình Nhu, the younger brother and right-hand man of President Diem, to discuss neutralization, a meeting that was leaked to the right-wing American columnist Joseph Alsop. At that point Kennedy lost interest in the "Maneli affair", instead deciding to back an alternative option he had been considering since August: a coup against the Ngo brothers.

While in India, he helped establish one of the first computer science departments, at the Indian Institute of Technology in Kanpur, Uttar Pradesh. (Even after leaving office, Galbraith remained a friend and supporter of India.) Because of his recommendation, First Lady of the United States Jacqueline Bouvier Kennedy undertook her 1962 diplomatic missions in India and Pakistan.

=== Johnson administration ===
After leaving the American embassy in India, Galbraith continued to advise Johnson, now president, against escalating American involvement in Vietnam. In 1965, he advised Johnson that he should "instruct officials and spokesmen to stop saying the future of mankind, the United States, and human liberty is being decided in Vietnam. It isn't; this merely builds up a difficult problem out of all proportion. It is also terrible politics". During the 1966 Buddhist crisis in South Vietnam, Galbraith wrote Johnson a letter on April 3 saying he now had "an opportunity only the God-fearing deserve and only the extremely lucky get", saying that if the government of Air Marshal Nguyễn Cao Kỳ should fall, Johnson should use the occasion to pull all Americans out of Vietnam.

On June 16, 1966, Galbraith offered to write Johnson a speech that would set out an orderly withdrawal of American forces over the next year. Galbraith advised Johnson the beginning of the Cultural Revolution in China represented an opportunity for a diplomatic settlement of the Vietnam war, predicting that Mao Zedong would lose interest in Vietnam now that he had launched his Cultural Revolution. The National Security Adviser, W.W. Rostow, wrote the reply to Galbraith that was signed by Johnson, curtly declaring: "I have never doubted your talent for political craftsmanship, and I am sure you could devise a script that would appear to justify our taking an unjustifiable course in South Vietnam". On June 28, 1966, Galbraith made his final attempt to change Johnson's mind, warning that the Vietnam War would ruin his presidency and that he should stop taking the advice of Rostow. Galbraith stated that Johnson had the potential to be one of the greatest presidents if only he find a way out of Vietnam, and concluded: "The people who want to invest more and more in this war have nothing to lose. They will end up working for a foundation".

In 1966, when he was no longer ambassador, he told the United States Senate that one of the main causes of the 1965 Kashmir war was American military aid to Pakistan.

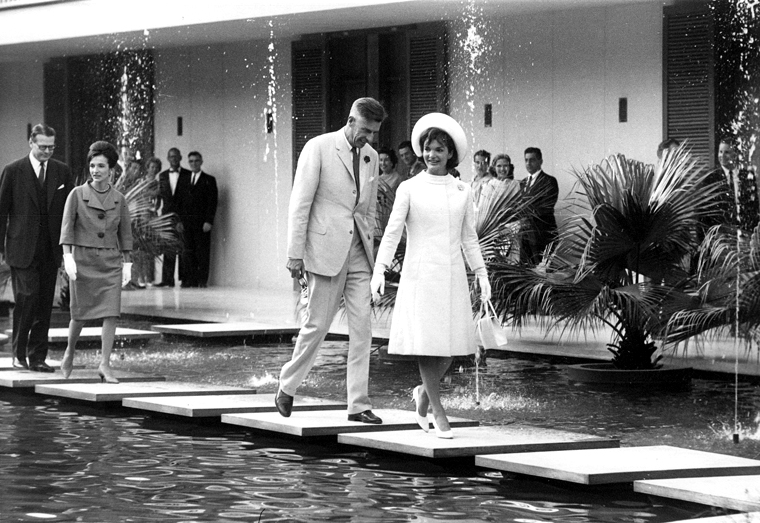
Galbraith and First Lady Jacqueline Kennedy at the US Chancery, New Delhi

In early 1968, Galbraith endorsed Senator Eugene McCarthy, who ran against Johnson on an anti-war platform. During the New Hampshire Democratic primary, Galbraith toured the Granite State, giving pro-McCarthy speeches in churches, union halls, campuses and house parties. As McCarthy had the reputation of being strange and frivolous, Galbraith's support and campaigning for him was important, as McCarthy needed the endorsement of mainstream figures to give him credibility. When the New Hampshire Democratic primary was held on March 12, 1968, Johnson defeated McCarthy by only about 300 votes, a humiliation for an incumbent president with a well funded campaign running against a senator widely considered to be too eccentric to be president, and who had only a fraction of the campaign money that Johnson had. Though Johnson won the primary, the very narrow margin of his victory was widely considered to be a defeat. On the night of the primary, Galbraith celebrated the result at McCarthy campaign headquarters as if it were an outright victory. The day after the New Hampshire primary, Galbraith was widely cheered by his students when he entered his lecture hall at Harvard.

The results of the New Hampshire primary showed that Johnson was vulnerable. On March 16, 1968, Senator Robert F. Kennedy announced he was entering the presidential race. Kennedy asked Galbraith to withdraw his endorsement of McCarthy and to endorse him instead, a request that Galbraith refused. The historian Arthur M. Schlesinger Jr., who campaigned with Galbraith in New Hampshire for McCarthy, switched his support to Kennedy, on the grounds that Kennedy was a far more electable candidate than the eccentric McCarthy, a man most people found to be too silly to be president. Schlesinger strongly urged Galbraith to support Kennedy, but Galbraith chose to continue to campaign for McCarthy, partly because McCarthy's liberalism was closer to his own politics, and partly out of a personal revulsion for Kennedy, whom he thought had only opportunistically entered the presidential race when it became clear that Johnson was not invincible. Galbraith had been friends with John Kennedy, but his relations with Robert were more difficult, as Galbraith found Robert too rigid, utterly convinced that he was always right. Galbraith later said that with Robert Kennedy "You were either for the cause or against it, with the Kennedys or a leper".

After Kennedy was assassinated, McCarthy became so depressed that he almost dropped out of the election, and Galbraith visited several times to urge him to continue, through Galbraith later admitted "...I don't believe Eugene McCarthy's heart was ever wholly in the battle". At the chaotic and violent Democratic National Convention in August 1968 in Chicago, Galbraith attended as the floor manager for the McCarthy campaign. Amid what was later called a "police riot", as the Chicago police fought in the streets with anti-Vietnam war protesters, Galbraith held an impromptu speech outside the Hilton Hotel before a group of demonstrators, urging them to reject violence and to have patience, while assuring them that the American system was capable of reform and change. Galbraith pointed to the armed Illinois National Guardsmen standing in the background and said that they, unlike the Chicago police, were not the enemy, as he maintained that most of the young men who joined the Illinois National Guard had only done so to avoid being drafted to fight in Vietnam. After finishing his speech, a National Guard sergeant approached Galbraith, who froze up in fear as he believed he was about to be arrested. Instead the sergeant wanted to shake hands, saying: "Thank you, sir. That was the first nice thing anyone has said about us all week".

At the convention, supporters of Johnson challenged Galbraith's right to serve as a delegate, and sought to expel him from the building. Galbraith quarreled with Johnson supporters on the convention floor as he sought to add a peace plank to the Democratic platform, which Johnson saw as an insult to himself, and ordered the delegates to reject. The Mayor of Chicago, Richard Daley, a Johnson supporter, had imposed such stringent security conditions that it was impossible to walk across the convention hall without jostling somebody else, which added to the tension of the convention as pro-war and anti-war Democrats fiercely argued about the platform, all of which was captured live on national television. Adding to the tension were televisions on the convention floor that showed what was happening outside, as the Chicago police attacked and beat anti-war demonstrators. On Daley's orders, the Chicago police searched Galbraith's room at the Hilton hotel, alleging that he was hiding anti-war protesters. None were found. After Vice President Hubert Humphrey won the Democratic nomination, Galbraith reluctantly endorsed Humphrey as preferable to the Republican candidate, Richard Nixon.

=== Later life and recognition ===
In autumn 1972, Galbraith was an adviser and assistant to Nixon's rival candidate, Senator George McGovern, in the election campaign for the American presidency. During this time (September 1972) he travelled to China in his role as president of the American Economic Association (AEA) at the invitation of Mao Zedong's communist government, together with fellow economists Wassily Leontief and James Tobin. In 1973, Galbraith published an account of his experiences in A China Passage, writing that there was "no serious doubt that China is devising a highly effective economic system," "[d]issidents are brought firmly into line in China, but, one suspects, with great politeness," and "Greater Shanghai ... has a better medical service than New York". He considered it not implausible that Chinese industrial and agricultural output was expanding annually at a rate of 10 to 11%.

In 1972 he served as president of the American Economic Association. The Journal of Post Keynesian Economics benefited from Galbraith's support and he served as the chairman of its board from its beginning.

During the shooting of The World at War, a British television documentary series (1973–74), Galbraith described his experiences in the Roosevelt war administration. Among other things, he spoke about the initial confusion during the first meeting of the major departmental leaders about kapok and its use. Galbraith also talked about rationing and especially about trickery during fuel allocation.

In December 1977, he met the Palauan senator Roman Tmetuchl and eventually became an unpaid adviser to the Palau Political Status Commission. He advocated for minimal financial requirement and infrastructure projects. In 1979 he addressed Palau's legislature and participated in a seminar for the delegates to the Palau Constitutional Convention. He became the first person to earn honorary citizenship of Palau.

In 1984, he visited the USSR, writing that the Soviet economy had made "great material progress" as, "in contrast to Western industrial economy," the USSR "makes full use of its manpower."

In 1985, the American Humanist Association named him the Humanist of the Year. The Association for Asian Studies (AAS) conferred its 1987 Award for Distinguished Contributions to Asian Studies.

External videos
- Memorial service for Galbraith at Memorial Church in Harvard Yard, Cambridge, May 31, 2006, C-SPAN

In 1997 he was made an Officer of the Order of Canada. In 2000 he was awarded the US Presidential Medal of Freedom. He also was awarded an honorary doctorate from Memorial University of Newfoundland at the fall convocation of 1999, another contribution to the impressive collection of approximately fifty academic honorary degrees bestowed upon Galbraith. In 2000, he was awarded the Leontief Prize for his outstanding contribution to economic theory by the Global Development and Environment Institute. The library in his hometown of Dutton, Ontario was renamed the John Kenneth Galbraith Reference Library in honor of his attachment to the library and his contributions to the new building.

On April 29, 2006, Galbraith died in Cambridge, Massachusetts, of natural causes at the age of 97, after a two-week stay in a hospital. He is interred at Indian Hill Cemetery in Middletown, Connecticut.

=== Family ===
On September 17, 1937, Galbraith married Catherine Merriam Atwater, whom he met while she was a Radcliffe graduate student. Their marriage lasted for 68 years. The Galbraiths resided in Cambridge, Massachusetts, and had a summer home in Townshend, Vermont. They had four sons: J. Alan Galbraith was a partner in the Washington, DC, law firm Williams & Connolly (now retired); Douglas Galbraith died in childhood of leukemia; Peter W. Galbraith has been an American diplomat who served as Ambassador to Croatia and is a commentator on American foreign policy, particularly in the Balkans and the Middle East; James K. Galbraith is a progressive economist at the University of Texas at Austin Lyndon B. Johnson School of Public Affairs. The Galbraiths also had ten grandchildren.

A memorial plaque stands adjoining a stone inukshuk overlooking the Galbraith family farm on the Thompson (Hogg) Line just east of Willey Road, just north of the one room school he attended. The family home—a large white farm house—still stands, as do many of the original farm buildings.

== Writings ==
Even before becoming a president of the American Economic Association, Galbraith was considered as an iconoclast by many economists. This is partly because he rejected the technical analysis and mathematical modelling of neoclassical economics as being divorced from reality. Following Thorstein Veblen, he believed that economic activity could not be distilled into inviolable laws, but rather was a complex product of the cultural and political milieu in which it occurs. In particular, he posited that important factors, such as the separation between corporate ownership and management, oligopoly, and the influence of government and military spending had been largely neglected by most economists because they are not amenable to axiomatic descriptions. In this sense, he worked as much in political economy as in classical economics.

His work included several best selling books throughout the fifties and sixties. His major contribution to the field of economics is the so-called American capitalism trilogy: The Affluent Society (1958), The New Industrial State (1967), and Economics and the Public Purpose (1973). Written in a clear and concise style, they were comprehensible to lay readers, not just economists.

After his retirement from Harvard as the Paul M. Warburg Professor of Economics, Emeritus, he remained in the public spotlight by continuing to write 21 new books, as well as completing a script in 1977 for a major series on economics for PBS and BBC television—The Age of Uncertainty, broadcast in 38 countries.

In addition to his books, he wrote hundreds of essays and a number of novels. Among his novels, A Tenured Professor achieved particular critical acclaim. Galbraith wrote book reviews, e.g., of The Report from Iron Mountain on the Possibility and Desirability of Peace, a 1967 political satire, under the pen name of Herschel McLandress, a name of a fictional Scottish mentor featured in the Tenured Professor. He also used the pseudonym, Mark Épernay, when he published The McLandress Dimension in 1963.

=== Economics books ===
Galbraith was an important figure in 20th-century institutional economics, and provided an exemplary institutionalist perspective on economic power. Among his numerous writings, Galbraith cherished The New Industrial State and The Affluent Society as his two best. As for the later works, economist and Galbraith friend Mike Sharpe visited him in 2004, on which occasion Galbraith gave Sharpe a copy of what would be Galbraith's last book, The Economics of Innocent Fraud. Galbraith confided in Sharpe that "this is my best book", an assertion Galbraith delivered "a little mischievously."

After the beginning of the Great Recession of 2008, Galbraith's The Great Crash, 1929 (1955) and other books containing warnings about the dangers of an unrestrained speculative mood without proper government oversight found an attentive readership again. In 2010, the Library of America published a new edition of Galbraith's major works, edited by his son, James K. Galbraith: The Affluent Society & Other Writings, 1952–1967: American Capitalism, The Great Crash, 1929, The Affluent Society, and The New Industrial State. On this occasion, Bill Moyers interviewed James K. Galbraith about his father, his works, and his legacy.

==== American economy ====
In American Capitalism: The Concept of Countervailing Power, published in 1952, Galbraith concluded that the American economy was managed by a triumvirate of big business, big labor, and an activist government. Galbraith defined the actions of the industry lobby groups and unions as countervailing power. He contrasted this arrangement with the period prior to the previous Depression, when big business had relatively free rein over the economy.

His 1955 bestseller The Great Crash, 1929 describes the Wall Street meltdown of stock prices and how markets progressively become decoupled from reality in a speculative boom. The book is also a platform for Galbraith's humor and keen insights into human behavior when wealth is threatened. It has never been out of print.

In The Affluent Society (1958), which became a bestseller, Galbraith outlined his view that to become successful, post–World War II America should make large investments in items such as highways and education, using funds from general taxation.

Galbraith also critiqued the assumption that continually increasing material production is a sign of economic and societal health. Because of this Galbraith is sometimes considered one of the first post-materialists. In this book, he popularized the old phrase "conventional wisdom". Galbraith worked on the book while in Switzerland and had originally titled it Why The Poor Are Poor, but changed it to The Affluent Society at his wife's suggestion. The Affluent Society contributed (likely to a significant degree, given that Galbraith had the ear of President Kennedy) to the War on Poverty, the government spending policy introduced by the administrations of Kennedy and Johnson.

==== New industrial state ====
In 1966, Galbraith was invited by the BBC to present the Reith Lectures, a series of radio broadcasts, which he titled The New Industrial State. Across six broadcasts, he explored the economics of production and the effect large corporations could have over the state.

In the print edition of The New Industrial State (1967), Galbraith expanded his analysis of the role of power in economic life, arguing that very few industries in the United States fit the model of perfect competition. A central concept of the book is the revised sequence. The 'conventional wisdom' in economic thought portrays economic life as a set of competitive markets governed, ultimately, by the decisions of sovereign consumers. In this original sequence, the control of the production process flows from consumers of commodities to the organizations that produce those commodities. In the revised sequence, this flow is reversed and businesses exercise control over consumers by advertising and related salesmanship activities.

The revised sequence concept applies only to the industrial system—that is, the manufacturing core of the economy in which each industry contains only a handful of very powerful corporations. It does not apply to the market system in the Galbraithian dual economy. In the market system, composed of the vast majority of business organizations, price competition remains the dominant form of social control. In the industrial system, however, composed of the 1,000 or so large corporations, competitive price theory obscures the relation to the price system of these large and powerful corporations. In Galbraith's view, the principal function of market relations in this industrial system is, not to constrain the power of the corporate behemoths, but to serve as an instrument for the implementation of their power. Moreover, the power of these corporations extends into commercial culture and politics, allowing them to exercise considerable influence upon popular social attitudes and value judgments. That this power is exercised in the shortsighted interest of expanding commodity production and the status of the few is both inconsistent with democracy and a barrier to achieving the quality of life that the new industrial state with its affluence could provide.

The New Industrial State not only provided Galbraith with another best-selling book, it also extended once again, the currency of institutionalist economic thought. The book also filled a very pressing need in the late 1960s. The conventional theory of monopoly power in economic life maintains that the monopolist will attempt to restrict supply in order to maintain price above its competitive level. The social cost of this monopoly power is a decrease in both allocative efficiency and the equity of income distribution. This conventional economic analysis of the role of monopoly power did not adequately address popular concern about the large corporation in the late 1960s. The growing concern focused on the role of the corporation in politics, the damage done to the natural environment by an unmitigated commitment to economic growth, and the perversion of advertising and other pecuniary aspects of culture. The New Industrial State gave a plausible explanation of the power structure involved in generating these problems and found a very receptive audience among the rising American counterculture and political activists.

A third related work was Economics and the Public Purpose (1973), in which he expanded on these themes by discussing, among other issues, the subservient role of women in the unrewarded management of ever-greater consumption, and the role of the technostructure in the large firm in influencing perceptions of sound economic policy aims.

==== Financial bubbles ====
In A Short History of Financial Euphoria (1990), he traces speculative bubbles through several centuries, and argues that they are inherent in the free market system because of "mass psychology" and the "vested interest in error that accompanies speculative euphoria." Also, financial memory is "notoriously short": what currently seems to be a "new financial instrument" is inevitably nothing of the sort. Galbraith cautions: "The world of finance hails the invention of the wheel over and over again, often in a slightly more unstable version." Crucial to his analysis is the assertion that the common factor in boom-and-bust is the creation of debt to finance speculation, which "becomes dangerously out of scale in relation to the underlying means of payment."

=== Legacy ===
Galbraith's main ideas focused around the influence of the market power of large corporations. He believed that this market power weakened the widely accepted principle of consumer sovereignty, allowing corporations to be price makers, rather than price takers, allowing corporations with the strongest market power to increase the production of their goods beyond an efficient amount. He further believed that market power played a major role in inflation. He argued that corporations and trade unions could only increase prices to the extent that their market power allowed. He argued that in situations of excessive market power, price controls effectively controlled inflation, but cautioned against using them in markets that were basically efficient such as agricultural goods and housing. He noted that price controls were much easier to enforce in industries with relatively few buyers and sellers. Galbraith's view of market power was not entirely negative; he also noted that the power of US firms played a part in the success of the US economy.

In The Affluent Society, Galbraith asserts that classical economic theory was true for the eras before the present, which were times of "poverty"; now, however, we have moved from an age of poverty to an age of "affluence", and for such an age, a completely new economic theory is needed.

Galbraith's main argument is that as society becomes relatively more affluent, private business must create consumer demand through advertising, and while this generates artificial affluence through the production of commercial goods and services, the public sector becomes neglected. He points out that while many Americans were able to purchase luxury items, their parks were polluted and their children attended poorly maintained schools. He argues that markets alone will under-provide (or fail to provide at all) for many public goods, whereas private goods are typically "over-provided" due to the process of advertising creating an artificial demand above the individual's basic needs. This emphasis on the power of advertising and consequent over-consumption may have anticipated the drop in savings rates in the US and elsewhere in the developing world.

Galbraith proposed curbing the consumption of certain products through greater use of pigovian taxes and land value taxes, arguing that this could be more efficient than other forms of taxation, such as labor taxes. Galbraith's major proposal was a program he called "investment in men"—a large-scale, publicly funded education program aimed at empowering ordinary citizens.

An International Symposium to honor John Kenneth Galbraith, sponsored by the l'Université du Littoral Côte d'Opale, Dunkerque and the Institut de Gestion Sociale, Paris, France, was held in September 2004 in Paris.

A special issue Commemorating John Kenneth Galbraith's Centenary of the Review of Political Economy was dedicated in 2008 to Galbraith's contribution to economics.

Three days before his death, Galbraith urged his son, economist James K. Galbraith, to "write a short book on corporate predation"; the younger Galbraith completed The Predator State in 2008.

=== Reception ===
Galbraith's work in general, and The Affluent Society in particular, have drawn sharp criticism from laissez-faire supporters since the time of their publications. Nobel Prize-winning economist Milton Friedman in "Friedman on Galbraith, and on curing the British disease" views Galbraith as a 20th-century version of the early-19th-century Tory radical of Great Britain. He argues that Galbraith believes in the superiority of aristocracy and in its paternalistic authority, that consumers should not be allowed choice, and that all should be determined by those with "higher minds", commenting: "Many reformers—Galbraith is not alone in this—have as their basic objection to a free market that it frustrates them in achieving their reforms, because it enables people to have what they want, not what the reformers want. Hence every reformer has a strong tendency to be averse to a free market."

Nobel Prize-winning economist Robert Solow, in a review of The New Industrial State, points at Galbraith's lack of empiricism and selectiveness in his use of evidence. He points out that "It may be unjust and pointless to consider the degree of literal truth of each of the assertions that make up this argument. One would hardly discuss Gulliver's Travels by debating whether there really are any little people, or criticize the Grande Jatte because objects aren't made up of tiny dots. Nevertheless, it may help to judge the truth of Galbraith's."

Richard Parker, in his biography, John Kenneth Galbraith: His Life, His Economics, His Politics, characterizes Galbraith as a more complex thinker. Galbraith's primary purpose in Capitalism: The Concept of Countervailing Power (1952) was, ironically, to show that big business was now necessary to the American economy to maintain the technological progress that drives economic growth. Galbraith knew that the "countervailing power", which included government regulation and collective bargaining, was necessary to balanced and efficient markets. In The New Industrial State (1967), Galbraith argued that the dominant American corporations had created a technostructure that closely controlled both consumer demand and market growth through advertising and marketing. While Galbraith defended government intervention, Parker notes that he also believed that government and big business worked together to maintain stability.

Paul Krugman downplayed Galbraith's stature as an academic economist in 1994. In Peddling Prosperity, he places Galbraith as one among many "policy entrepreneurs"—either economists, or think tank writers, left and right—who write solely for the public, as opposed to those who write for other academics, and who are, therefore, liable to make unwarranted diagnoses and offer over-simplistic answers to complex economic problems. Krugman asserts that Galbraith was never taken seriously by fellow academics, who instead viewed him as more of a "media personality". For example, Krugman believes that Galbraith's work, The New Industrial State, is not considered to be "real economic theory", and that Economics in Perspective is "remarkably ill-informed".

Thomas Sowell in his 1995 book The Vision of the Anointed, criticized Galbraith's claims in The Affluent Society and The New Industrial State that large corporations are invincible to competition, by citing Toyota and Honda's takeover of the United States' automobile market at the expense of General Motors, the decline of Life magazine, and overall, the displacement of almost half of the firms in 1980's Fortune 500 in the 1990 edition. Sowell also criticized Galbraith's assertion that successful corporate management was immune to corporate shake-ups. Sowell believed Galbraith's contemptuousness towards the idea of a lone entrepreneur starting up a new, powerful company to not have stood up to the test of time; Sowell used Steve Jobs and Bill Gates as counterexamples.

=== Memoirs ===
External videos
- Discussion with Galbraith and biographer Richard Parker, May 9, 2002, C-SPAN
- Discussion with Parker on John Kenneth Galbraith: His Life, His Politics, His Economics, April 17, 2005, C-SPAN

The first edition of The Scotch was published in the UK under two alternative titles: as Made to Last and The Non-potable Scotch: A Memoir of the Clansmen in Canada. It was illustrated by Samuel H. Bryant. Galbraith's account of his boyhood environment in Elgin County in southern Ontario was added in 1963. He considered it his finest piece of writing.

Galbraith memoir, A Life in Our Times was published in 1981. It contains discussion of his thoughts, his life, and his times. In 2004, the publication of an authorized biography, John Kenneth Galbraith: His Life, His Politics, His Economics by a friend and fellow progressive economist Richard Parker renewed interest in Galbraith's life journey and legacy.

== Honors ==
John Kenneth Galbraith was one of the few people to receive both the World War II Medal of Freedom and the Presidential Medal of Freedom; respectively in 1946 from President Truman and in 2000 from President Bill Clinton. He was elected to the American Academy of Arts and Sciences in 1952 and the American Philosophical Society in 1980. He was a recipient of Lomonosov Gold Medal in 1993 for his contributions to science. He also was appointed to the Order of Canada in 1997 and, in 2001, awarded the Padma Vibhushan, India's second highest civilian award, for his contributions to strengthening ties between India and the United States. The government of France made him a Commandeur de la Légion d'honneur.

In 2010, he became the first economist to have his works included in the Library of America series.

Minor Planet (4089) Galbraith is named in his honour.

=== Honorary degrees ===
John Kenneth Galbraith received fifty Honorary Degrees from institutions around the world:

Honorary Degrees

Location	Date	School	Degree
New York	1958	Bard College	Doctor of Laws (LL.D.)
Ontario	1961	University of Toronto	Doctor of Laws (LL.D.)
India	1961	Annamalai University	D. Litt.
Massachusetts	October 6, 1963	Brandeis University	Doctor of Laws (LL.D.)
Ontario	May 1965	University of Guelph	Doctor of Laws (LL.D.)
Saskatchewan	May 20, 1965	University of Saskatchewan	Doctor of Laws (LL.D.)
Michigan	1966	University of Michigan	Doctor of Laws (LL.D.)
Massachusetts	1967	Boston College	Doctor of Laws (LL.D.)
New York	1967	Hobart and William Smith Colleges	Doctor of Laws (LL.D.)
Ontario	1967	Queen's University	Doctor of Laws (LL.D.)
Ontario	May 31, 1968	University of Western Ontario	Doctor of Laws (LL.D.)
Massachusetts	1968	Tufts University	Doctor of Humane Letters (DHL)
Michigan	1968	Albion College	Doctor of Letters (D.Litt.)
Illinois	1970	Knox College	
Michigan	Fall 1971	Michigan State University	Doctor of Laws (LL.D.)
Ontario	Spring 1976	York University	Doctor of Laws (LL.D.)
Minnesota	1977	Carleton College	
New Jersey	1979	Rutgers University	Doctor of Laws (LL.D.)
Iowa	1983	Grinnell College	Doctor of Laws (LL.D.)
Ontario	November 1984	McMaster University	Doctor of Letters (D.Litt.)
Massachusetts	June 1988	Harvard University	Doctor of Laws (LL.D.)
Massachusetts	1989	Smith College	Doctor of Laws (LL.D.)
Poland	1992	Warsaw School of Economics	Doctorate
United Kingdom	June 28, 1999	London School of Economics	Doctor of Science (D.Sc.)
Newfoundland and Labrador	Fall 1999	Memorial University of Newfoundland	Doctor of Letters (D.Litt.)

== Works ==
External videos
- Presentation by Galbraith on The Culture of Contentment, October 27, 1992, C-SPAN
- Booknotes interview with Galbraith on A Journey Through Economic Time, November 13, 1994, C-SPAN
- Presentation by Galbriath on The Good Society, May 1, 1996, C-SPAN
- Presentation by Galbraith on Letters to Kennedy, May 26, 1998, C-SPAN
- Presentation by Galbraith on Name-Dropping: From FDR On, June 8, 1999, C-SPAN

- Modern Competition and Business Policy (with Henry S. Dennison), 1938
- National Resources Planning Board, The economic effects of the federal public works expenditures, 1933–1938 (1940) online
- A Theory of Price Control, 1952
- American Capitalism: The Concept of Countervailing Power, 1952
- The Great Crash, 1929, 1954
- Economics and the Art of Controversy, 1955
- The Affluent Society, 1958
- Journey to Poland and Yugoslavia, 1958
- Perspectives on Conservation, 1958
- The Liberal Hour, 1960
- Economic Development in Perspective, 1962
- The Scotch, 1963
- The McLandress Dimension (under the pseudonym Mark Épernay), 1963
- Economic Development, 1964
- The New Industrial Estate (BBC Reith Lectures), 1966
- The New Industrial State, 1967 online
- Beginner's Guide to American Studies, 1967
- How to get out of Vietnam, 1967
- The Triumph (novel), 1968
- Ambassador's Journal, 1969
- How to control the military, 1969
- Indian Painting (with Mohinder Singh Randhawa), 1969
- Who needs democrats, and what it takes to be needed, 1970
- The American Left and Some British Comparisons, 1971
- Economics, Peace and Laughter, 1972
- Power and the Useful Economist, 1973
- Economics and the Public Purpose, 1973
- A China Passage, 1973
- John Kenneth Galbraith introduces India (Editor), 1974
- Money: Whence It Came, Where It Went, 1975
- Socialism in rich countries and poor, 1975
- The Economic effects of the Federal public works expenditures, 1933-38 (with G. Johnson), 1975
- The Age of Uncertainty (PBS and BBC 13 part television series), 1977
- The Galbraith Reader, 1977
- Almost Everyone's Guide to Economics (with Nicole Salinger), 1978
- Annals of an Abiding Liberal, 1979
- The Nature of Mass Poverty, 1979
- A Life in Our Times, 1981 online
- The Voice of the Poor, 1983
- The Anatomy of Power, 1983
- Essays from the Poor to the Rich (with Paul McCracken), 1983
- Reaganomics: Meaning, Means and Ends, 1983
- A View from the Stands, 1986
- Economics in Perspective: A Critical History, 1987
  - A History of Economics: The Past as the Present, 1987 online
- Capitalism, Communism and Coexistence (with Stanislav Menshikov), 1988
- Unconventional Wisdom: Essays on Economics in Honour of John Kenneth Galbraith (Editor), 1989 online
- A Tenured Professor, 1990
- The Culture of Contentment, 1992 online
- Recollections of the New Deal: When People Mattered (Editor), 1992
- A Journey Through Economic Time, 1994
- The World Economy Since the Wars: A Personal View, 1994 online
- A Short History of Financial Euphoria, 1994
- The Good Society: the humane agenda, 1996
- Letters to Kennedy, 1998
- The socially concerned today, 1998
- Name-Dropping: From F.D.R. On, 1999
- The Essential Galbraith, 2001
- The Economics of Innocent Fraud, 2004

== See also ==
- List of liberal theorists
- Modern liberalism in the United States
- The Best and the Brightest
- The bezzle (Term)
