= Stanislav Menshikov =

Russian economist (1927–2014)

Stanislav Mikhaĭlovich Menʹshikov (Russian: Станисла́в Миха́йлович Ме́ньшиков; 12 May 1927, in Moscow – 13 November 2014, in Amsterdam), was a Russian economist and former Soviet diplomat. He is the author of numerous publications in Russian and English including The Anatomy of Russian Capitalism, and a chapter in Capitalism, Communism and Coexistence. He was a professor at the Central Economic Mathematical Institute at the Russian Academy of Sciences in Moscow. Menshikov was married to fellow economist Larissa Klimenko-Menshikova.

== Soviet career ==
He was formerly employed at the Institute of World Economy and International Relations of the Soviet Academy of Sciences during the attempted economic reforms of Nikita Khrushchev. In the late 1970s, Menshikov spent six years on the Secretariat of the United Nations in New York, during which time he was often asked to comment upon the U.S. economy by The New York Times. During the 1980s, he served as a spokesman for the Soviet government on U.S. television.

== Post-Soviet career ==
Menshikov has published and commented on questions of economic transition. He co-authored Capitalism, Communism and Coexistence with John Kenneth Galbraith and wrote The Anatomy of Russian Capitalism. He has been active with the LaRouche Movement's Schiller Institute and has spoken at their conferences, along with Russian politician and author Sergey Glazyev. The English translation of Menshikov's book, The Anatomy of Russian Capitalism, was published by LaRouche's Executive Intelligence Review. In addition, he took part in panel discussion along with the Dalai Lama, David Bohm and Robert Rauschenberg on the topic of "From Fragmentation to Wholeness" in a video released by the Yale Forum on Religion and Ecology. Menshikov also authored a Russian-language book on the subject of a "compassionate economy" in response to request from the Dalai Lama.
