= The Anatomy of Power =

1983 book by John Kenneth Galbraith

- Author: John Kenneth Galbraith
- Subject: politics, political science
- Publisher: Houghton Mifflin Harcourt
- Publication date: 1983

The Anatomy of Power is a book written by Harvard economist John Kenneth Galbraith, originally published in 1983 by Houghton Mifflin Harcourt. It sought to classify three types of power: compensatory power in which submission is bought, condign power in which submission is won by making the alternative sufficiently painful, and conditioned power in which submission is gained by persuasion. In short, money, force and ideology.

It further divided power by source: power either stems from personality or leadership, property or wealth, or organisation.

The book goes on to detail a brief history of the use of power, noting the broad arc of history in moving away from condign and towards compensatory and then conditioned power, and from personality and property towards organisation. Finally, it details what Galbraith views as the main sources of power in the modern world: government, the military, religion and the press.

== See also ==
- Global policeman
- Ideocracy
- International law
- Power politics
- Power Politics (Wight book)
- State collapse
- Superpower collapse
- The True Believer: Thoughts on the Nature of Mass Movements
