= The Predator State =

2008 book by James K. Galbraith

The Predator State: How Conservatives Abandoned the Free Market and Why Liberals Should Too
- Author: James K. Galbraith
- Language: English
- Subject: Economics, Political Economy
- Publisher: Free Press
- Publication date: 2008
- Publication place: United States
- Pages: 221
- ISBN: 9781416566830
- OCLC: 664430097

The Predator State: How Conservatives Abandoned the Free Market and Why Liberals Should Too is a book by economist James K. Galbraith, first published in 2008. The title refers to how in US society, as Galbraith sees it, public institutions have been subverted to serve private profit: the "predators" being corporate elites. He argues that these corporate interests run the state "not for any ideological project—but simply in a way that would bring to them, individually and as a group, the most money.”

== Background ==
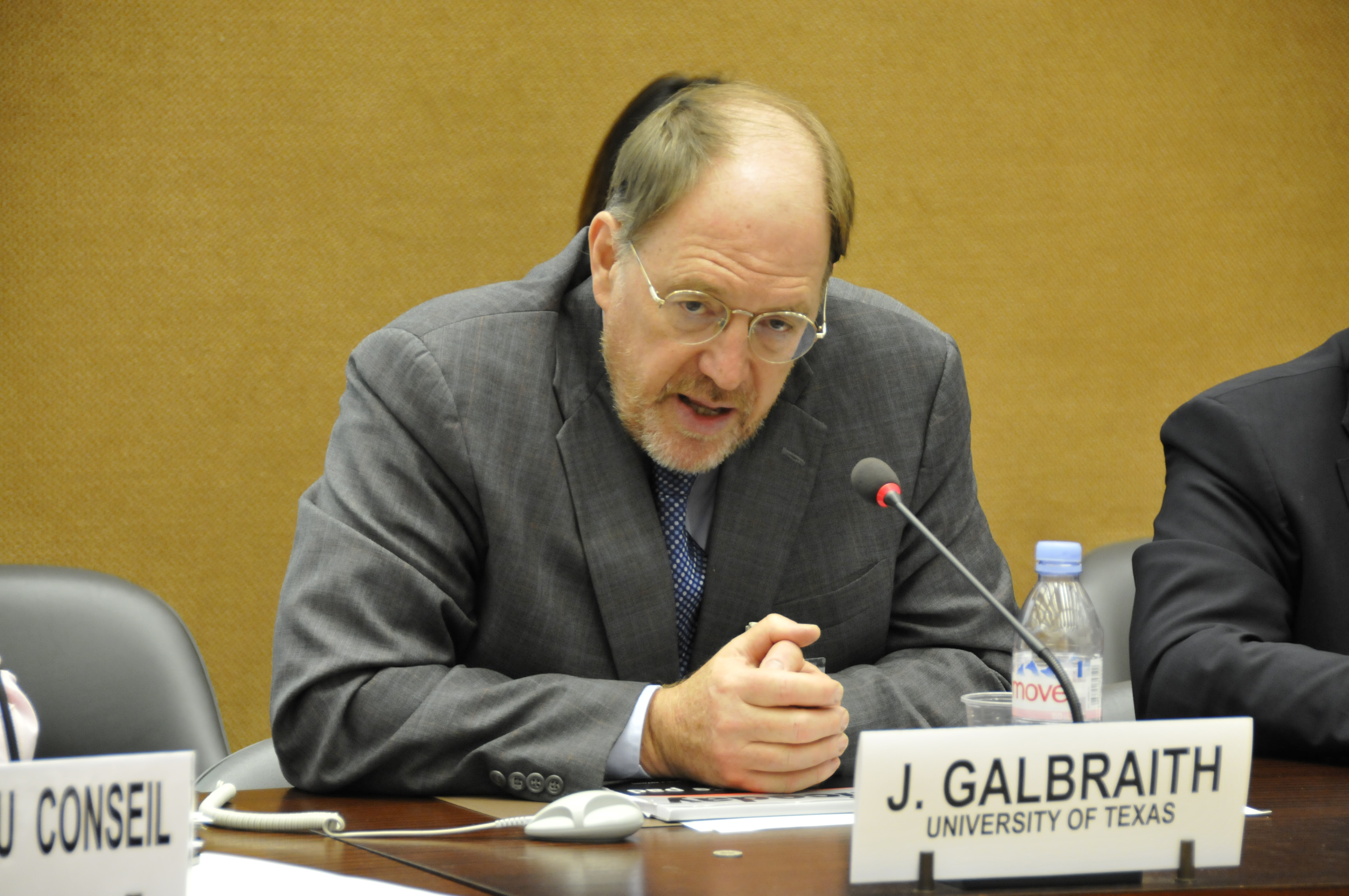
James Galbraith

Galbraith was teaching economics at the University of Texas at Austin at the time of the book's creation. His previous book as author was Created Unequal: The Crisis in American Pay, published in 1998. In April 2006 the author visited his father, John Kenneth Galbraith, who had had a decorated career as an economist, public official and ambassador. In this final meeting before his death, the elder Galbraith suggested that James write a book about "corporate predation".

The book was written in the aftermath of Hurricane Katrina's devastation of New Orleans, but before the 2008 financial crisis. Galbraith related both events to the ideas described in the book. For him, the Katrina disaster was a defining failure of the political system, since a political hostility to the public sector had inspired the degradation (or selling off) of publicly owned emergency services. Writing a preface for the paperback edition, which came out after the 2008 crash, Galbraith blamed the ongoing crisis on deregulation which, in the name of free markets, had left the financial predators to police themselves.

== Content ==
The book has three sections. The first portrays free markets as a cultural myth which is not really believed by its proponents. The second explains the operation of the predator state, where economic inequality is not a side-effect of economic development but a consequence of greedy private interests taking more for themselves. The third has some recommendations for dealing with predators; getting the benefits of private enterprise without giving excessive power to corporate elites.

In countering the belief that free markets will always produce the economically best outcomes, Galbraith disputes the narrative of US economic history that goes with it. While that narrative credits US prosperity to enterprise breaking free from regulation, he credits it to public institutions created in the New Deal, including social security and Medicare.

The book criticises American conservatives who advocate small-government policies while, in practice, expanding government spending and pursuing "free trade agreements" that undermine free trade. It also criticises liberals for unquestioningly taking on free-market principles such as balanced budgets and government non-intervention. Galbraith describes the goal of the book as "to free up the liberal mind".

As Galbraith explains it, the labels of "conservative" or "liberal" are unhelpful, as is the supposed tension between the politics of small government and big government. He sees the contest as between the super-rich predators and the rest of society. The predators demand privatization when the economy is doing well, so they can acquire assets, but in hard times, predators cast themselves as too big to fail and use their political power to get protection from the state, even getting government into debt to support their institutions.

== Reception ==
Reviewing the book for the Journal of Economic Issues, L. Randall Wray describes it as "political economy at its best [...] equally deserving of status as a classic" as John Kenneth Galbraith's The New Industrial State and Thorstein Veblen's The Theory of the Leisure Class, both of which it can be said to update. Wray praises both the prose style and the arguments themselves which "appear unassailable".

In the New York Times, Roger Lowenstein praises the book's prose but disputes many of its arguments. He writes, "the gusto with which [Galbraith] repeatedly challenges tired conventions is refreshing" but "his prose is absolutist in proportion to the extent to which his assertions are unprovable," concluding "It is not brilliant economics, but give him his due: He has raised trenchant questions about a system in crisis."

In the Shanghai Daily, Wan Lixin writes that most books on economics and management lack true insight, but makes an exception for The Predator State, which "does not provide answers, nor real solutions, [but] has the potential to help you think on your own." In particular, Lixin praises Galbraith for observing that standard economic concepts such as GDP growth do not take into account the interests of future generations, and hence that free markets do not plan well for future events.

A review in Publishers Weekly describes the book as "highly readable" and rich in stimulating ideas, but "sometimes scattershot", with conclusions sometimes unclear or contradictory.

USA Today listed The Predator State among the best business books of 2008.

== Editions ==
The book was printed in several editions through 2008 and 2009, by the Simon and Schuster imprint Free Press. The book has been published in Chinese by a Beijing-based publisher. An audiobook version, read by William Hughes, was released in 2009 and an ebook edition was published in 2014.
