= Richard Parker (economist) =

American social scientist and editor

Richard Parker (born November 5, 1946) is an economist from the United States. He is a graduate of Dartmouth College and the University of Oxford, and has worked for the United Nations Development Programme. Parker co-founded Mother Jones magazine and is on the editorial board of The Nation. He wrote the books The Myth of the Middle Class, Mixed Signals: the Future of Global Television News, and John Kenneth Galbraith: His Life, His Politics, His Economics.

Parker was a lecturer in public policy and senior fellow at Harvard's Shorenstein Center.

In June 2008, Parker was elected the 26th President of the liberal political advocacy group Americans for Democratic Action.
