= A Tenured Professor =

1990 novel by John Kenneth Galbraith

- First edition (US)
- Author: John Kenneth Galbraith
- Language: English
- Genre: Satire
- Publisher: Houghton Mifflin (US); Sinclair Stevenson (UK)
- Publication date: Feb 21, 1990 (US); Nov 12, 1990 (UK)
- Publication place: United States
- Media type: Print (Hardcover)
- Pages: 197 pp
- ISBN: 0395471001
- OCLC: 59837135

A Tenured Professor (1990) is a satirical novel by Canadian-American economist and Harvard professor emeritus John Kenneth Galbraith about a liberal university teacher who sets out to change American society by making money and then using it for the public good. Set at Harvard mainly during the Reagan administration, the plot and all the characters that appear in the story are entirely fictitious.

== Plot summary ==
The book chronicles the rise to fame of one Montgomery Marvin, a professor of economics who, as an academic teacher, keeps a low profile but who nevertheless is given tenure quite early in his career. While outwardly concerning himself with unspectacular research focusing on "Mathematical Paradigms in an Approach to Refrigerator Pricing" (which is also the title of his Ph.D. thesis), Marvin's extracurricular activities centre on becoming very rich in a very short time. For that purpose, Marvin has devised a new formula—a stock forecasting model by means of which he and his wife can cash in on people's euphoria, greed and, as they call it, dementia. Eventually, while everyone loses money in the wake of the "Black Monday" stock market crash of October 19, 1987, the Marvins gain an awful lot. (See also Michael Milken and leveraged buyout.)

They decide to spend their money wisely, according to their liberal agenda. Intent on strictly observing the code of business ethics, they start to make use of the "positive power of wealth" and embark on a life of philanthropy. They fund a number of chairs in peace studies to be established at, of all places, military academies. They also secure legislation by which companies are required to label their products according to the percentage of female executives employed by them. After they have launched several of their projects, their operations are increasingly considered un-American and officially put under surveillance. But whatever will happen - Marvin knows that he will be able to nourish his family, as he has been accorded tenure.

A Tenured Professor was republished as paperback by Houghton Mifflin in 2001 (ISBN 0-618-15455-8).

== Reception ==
A New York Times reviewer commented: "Watching Mr. Galbraith's Tenured Professor and his wife shake up Harvard and cut up the corporate world makes for a lively satire".
