= American Capitalism =

1952 book by John Kenneth Galbraith

American Capitalism: The Concept of Countervailing Power
- First edition
- Author: John Kenneth Galbraith
- Publisher: Houghton Mifflin
- Publication date: 1952

American Capitalism: The Concept of Countervailing Power is a book by John Kenneth Galbraith, written in 1952. It contains a critique of the view that markets, left to their own devices, will provide socially optimal solutions. Galbraith agrees with F. A. Hayek as far as the assertion goes that "the price system will fulfil [its] function only if competition prevails, that is, if the individual producer has to adapt to price changes and cannot control them." The book presents Galbraith's account of the inter-relationship between politics and economics which for Galbraith is based on a theory of competition guiding a capitalistic democratic society.

== Synopsis and summary ==
Galbraith builds on work by Prof. E. H. Chamberlin of Harvard and Joan Robinson at Cambridge, as well as the work done by Joe S. Bain of the University of California at Berkeley, arguing that the America of the early 1950s no longer complied to a textbook definition of Perfect competition. On page 66 he sets out the conclusions which result from the abandonment of competitive behaviour in favour of oligopoly or crypto-monopoly:

"The producer now has measurable control over his prices. Hence, prices are no longer an impersonal force selecting the efficient man, forcing him to adapt the most efficient mode and scale of operations and driving out the inefficient and incompetent. One can as well suppose that prices will be an umbrella which efficient and incompetent producers will tacitly agree to hold at a safe level over their heads and under which all will live comfortably, profitably and inefficiently."

Just as the market at the micro-level may not always work to society's advantage, Galbraith concludes that Keynes was correct in his explanation of the deficiencies of the macro-model where an equilibrium was possible below the full employment level of output and that without outside intervention, this equilibrium might persist.

Galbraith highlights the role of "Countervailing Power" in dealing with market failure & outlines its operation at the micro, and at the macro levels. At the micro level, firms might merge or band together to influence the price. Individual wage earners might also combine in unions to influence wage rates. Finally, government might intervene in the market place where required to provide regulation where countervailing power failed to develop but was nevertheless required. He concluded that Countervailing power was legitimate and welcome as the alternative of state control would be much less palatable to the business community. Without countervailing power, Galbraith concluded (p181):

"private decisions could and presumably would lead to the unhampered exploitation of the public, or of workers, farmers and others who are intrinsically weak as individuals. Such decisions would be a proper object of state interference or would soon so become."
