= Technostructure =

Bureaucrats who shape an organisations's economy

Diagram, proposed by Henry Mintzberg, showing the main parts of organisation, including technostructure

Technostructure is the group of technicians, analysts within an organisation (enterprise, administrative body) with considerable influence and control on its economy. The term was coined by the economist John Kenneth Galbraith in The New Industrial State (1967). It usually refers to managerial capitalism where the managers and other company leading administrators, scientists, or lawyers retain more power and influence than the shareholders in the decisional and directional process.

== Historical context ==
The power struggle between the technostructure and the shareholders was first evoked by Thorstein Veblen in "The Theory of the Leisure Class" (1899), questioning who, among the managers and the shareholders, should control the enterprise. At the time and until the end of the 1980s, the shareholders, unable to effectively regroup and organise themselves, could not exert enough pressure to effectively counter the managerial decision-making process. After the Second World War, the rapid augmentation of shareholders further diluted their collective power. This was perceived, by Galbraith, as a divorce between the property of the capital and the direction of the enterprise.

== Goals of the technostructure ==
Since the technostructure is composed of a hierarchical system of influential employees inside the enterprise, its primary goal is not to maximize their profits but rather survival, continuous growth and maximal size. While it must maintain acceptable relations with their shareholders, hegemonic growth is more beneficial to the technostructure.

According to Henry Mintzberg, a technostructure's influence is based on systems of expertise, but a technostructure gains power to the extent to which it can develop systems of bureaucratic control. Strong organisational ideology decreases the need for bureaucratic control and technostructure. Thus, a technostructure usually resists the development and/or maintenance of organisational ideology.

As the structures of control and adaptation that the technostructure designs are more necessary when something changes, technostructure is in favour of constant change. That happens even if they are not useful for the organisation itself. On the other hand, Mintzberg thinks that such changes tend to be cautious, as technostructure tries to standardise the work of all other parts of the organisation, and major changes make that harder.

Among organisation's goals technostructure prefers the ones that are operational, measurable, as they make it easiest to demonstrate the usefulness of bureaucratic control. Among those goals, technostructure prefers the ones related to efficiency, economical goals.

== Decline of the technostructure ==
The lack of control of the technostructure resulted in managerial abuse notably on its salaries during the economic crisis of the 1970s. It prompted support for new economic ideologies like the School of Chicago under Milton Friedman. Furthermore, the Employee Retirement Income Security Act of 1974 forced a much greater transparency from businesses and possible opposition to their decisions. In the 1980s, the rising and influential neoliberal ideology decried the divorce between the capital and the decisions. Based on the belief of a new emerging economy, neoliberal economic theories were introduced at the end of the 1980s forcing managerial capitalism to yield to the shareholders.

== Results ==
The prime objective of the neoliberal economic theories is the maximization of the profits in order to maximize stock value. This, quite evidently, greatly differed from the objectives of the technostructure which caused massive restructuring in the 1990s. In order to maximize profits, enterprises now had to take draconian measures to cut expenses and ensure profits for the shareholders. This greatly encouraged the exportation of manual or simple tasks to foreign countries where labour is much less expensive and caused massive layoffs in developed countries. Likewise, it reduced salaries and caused a decline in income of the working class. Paradoxically, the salaries of the managers increased and the constant demand for profits played an important role in the accounting scandals in 2002.

== See also ==
- Managerialism
