= The New Industrial State =

1967 book by John Kenneth Galbraith

- First edition
- Author: John Kenneth Galbraith
- Language: English
- Genre: Non-fiction
- Publisher: Houghton Mifflin
- Publication date: 1967

The New Industrial State is a 1967 book by John Kenneth Galbraith. Three revised editions appeared in 1972, 1978 and 1985.

== Discussion ==
In it, Galbraith asserts that within the industrial sectors of modern capitalist societies, the traditional mechanism of supply and demand is supplanted by the planning of large corporations, using techniques such as advertising and, where necessary, vertical integration.

The book followed Galbraith's 1966 series of BBC Reith Lectures – a series of six radio broadcasts, also titled The New Industrial State – in which he explored the economics of production and the effect large corporations could have over the state.

Galbraith argues that this is made necessary by the long-term planning required for production processes involving advanced technology (and that these same technological challenges were answered with similar types of planning in Soviet societies) which involve substantial additional risk. One of the results of this is, according to Galbraith, that perfect competition as generally understood in classical economic theory is no longer a useful explanation of the industrial sector (although it is still useful in sectors of the economy that are still dominated by small firms).

Galbraith argues that the "industrial system" – by which he means (in general terms) the companies which control around two-thirds of output in key sectors of the economy – are controlled in practice by a technostructure rather than shareholders; he claims that the technostructure does not act to maximise profit (as that involves the risk of failure) but principally to maintain the organisation and, as a secondary aim, to ensure its further expansion.

He says that a key aim of the technostructure is to maintain its control over the company, and so it prefers financing via retained profits to bank borrowing; thus returns to shareholders are lowered to ensure the company does not risk its self-reliance. Furthermore, the companies of the industrial system facilitate a system of informal price fixing and price stability to ensure long-term planning is feasible.

Galbraith also asserts that the traditional notions of risk most closely associated with small enterprise become less relevant to large industrial enterprises and conglomerates. Risk is diminished, Galbraith says, by advantages large enterprises have in securing longer-term supplier and labor contracts, and by the use of financial instruments such as commodity futures to mitigate volatility in raw materials prices. Political influence of large industrial concerns in governmental economic and labor policy is cited as another factor that tends to create the stable market conditions that are necessary for corporations' long-term planning of production.

The New Industrial State covers much of the same ground as Galbraith's 1958 work, The Affluent Society, but substantially expands and extends those ideas.

== Reviews ==
Economist Walter Adams challenged the assumptions made by Galbraith.

== See also ==
- The Predator State
