= Conventional wisdom =

Generally accepted ideas

The conventional wisdom or received opinion is the body of ideas or explanations generally accepted by the public or by experts in a field.

== History ==
The term "conventional wisdom" dates back to at least 1838, as a synonym for "commonplace knowledge". (Note: "It will be seen that we appeal, in such a case, neither to the records of legislation nor yet to the conventional wisdom of our forefathers."—(presumably) T. Frelinghuysen) It was used in a number of works, occasionally in a benign or neutral sense, but more often pejoratively. Despite this previous usage, the term is often credited to the economist John Kenneth Galbraith, who used it in his 1958 book The Affluent Society:

It will be convenient to have a name for the ideas which are esteemed at any time for their acceptability, and it should be a term that emphasizes this predictability. I shall refer to these ideas henceforth as the conventional wisdom.

Galbraith specifically prepended "The" to the phrase to emphasize its uniqueness, and sharpened its meaning to narrow it to those commonplace beliefs that are also acceptable and comfortable to society, thus enhancing their ability to resist facts that might diminish them. He repeatedly referred to it throughout the text of The Affluent Society, invoking it to explain the high degree of resistance in academic economics to new ideas. For these reasons, he is usually credited with the invention and popularization of the phrase in modern usage.

== See also ==
- Common knowledge
- Common sense
- Public opinion
