= The Affluent Society =

1958 book by John Kenneth Galbraith

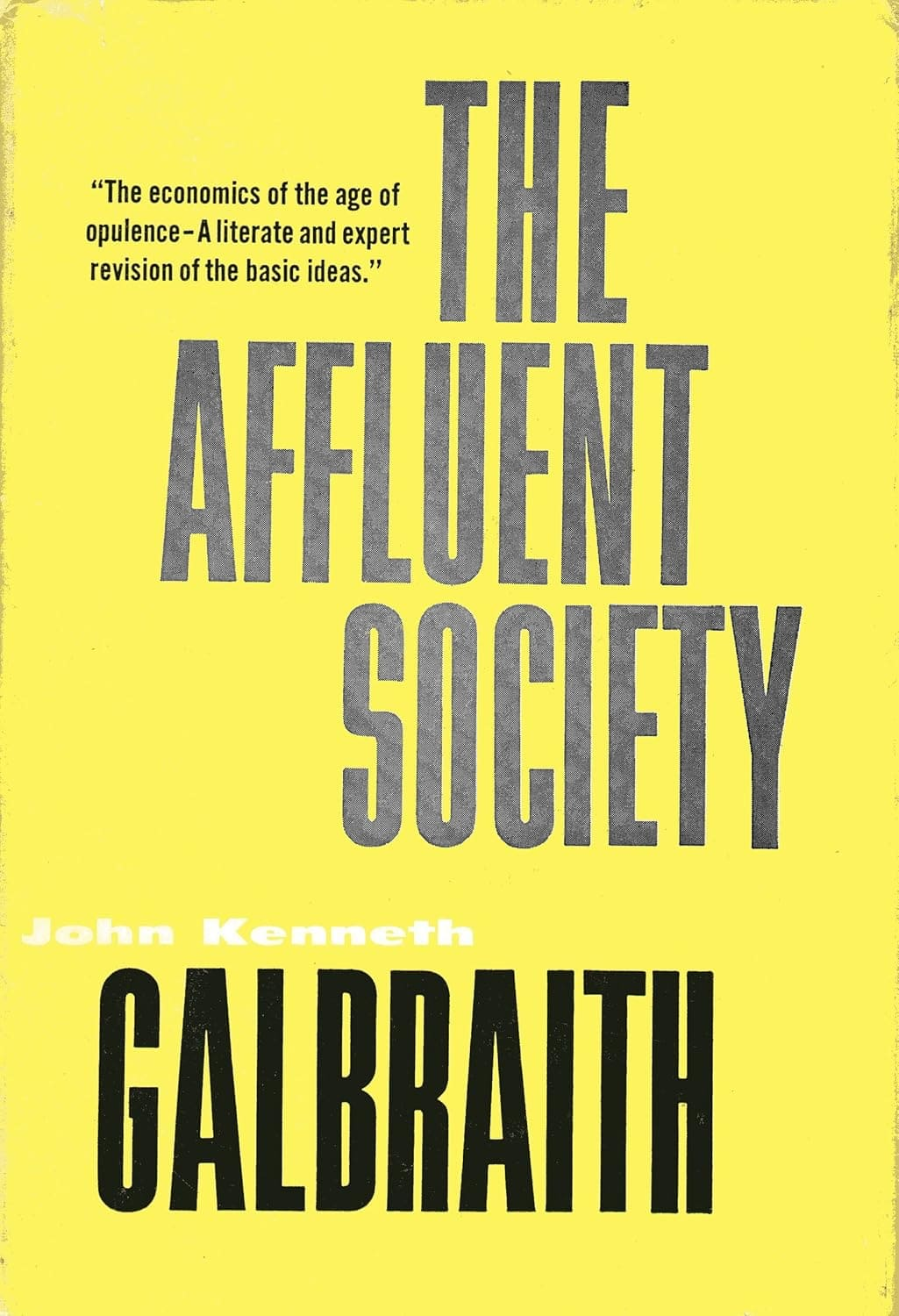
- First edition cover
- Author: John Kenneth Galbraith
- Language: English
- Subject: Economics
- Genre: Non-fiction
- Publisher: Houghton Mifflin
- Publication date: 1958
- Publication place: United States
- Media type: Print
- Pages: 280

The Affluent Society is a 1958 (4th edition revised 1984) book by Harvard economist John Kenneth Galbraith. The book sought to clearly outline the manner in which the post–World War II United States was becoming wealthy in the private sector but remained poor in the public sector, lacking social and physical infrastructure, and perpetuating income disparities. The book sparked much public discussion at the time. It is also credited with popularizing the term "conventional wisdom". Many of the ideas presented were later expanded and refined in Galbraith's 1967 book, The New Industrial State.

The Modern Library placed the book at No. 46 on its list of the top 100 English-language non-fiction books of the 20th century.

== Themes ==
- The "central tradition" in economics, created by Adam Smith and expanded by David Ricardo and Thomas Robert Malthus in the late eighteenth and early nineteenth centuries, is poorly suited to the affluent post–World War II U.S. society. This is so because the "central tradition" economists wrote during a time of widespread poverty where production of basic goods was necessary. U.S. society, at the time of Galbraith's writing, was one of widespread affluence, where production was based on luxury goods and wants.
- Using production, or gross domestic product, as a measure of U.S. society's well-being omits important measures of social and personal well-being. GDP also neglects differences in output. For example, "An increased supply of educational services has a standing in the total not different in kind from an increased output of television receivers." Production has risen to its paramount but unwarranted status because it is held in grace by both Democrats and Republicans. Galbraith writes:

On the importance of production as a test of performance, there is no difference between Republicans and Democrats, right and left, white and minimally prosperous black, Catholic and Protestant. It is common ground for the Chairman of Americans for Democratic Action, the President of the United States Chamber of Commerce and the President of the National Association of Manufactures.

- American demand for goods and services is not organic. That is, the demands are not internally created by a consumer. These such demands - food, clothes, and shelter - have been met for the vast majority of Americans. The new demands are created by advertisers and the "machinery for consumer-demand creation" that benefit from increased consumer spending. This exuberance in private production and consumption pushes out public spending and investment. He called this the dependence effect, a process by which "wants are increasingly created by the process by which they are satisfied". He argued that lauding production creating demand via advertising is as like one "who applauds the efforts of the squirrel to keep abreast of the wheel that is propelled by his own efforts."
- Galbraith believes America must transition from a private production economy to a public investment economy. He advocates three large proposals: the elimination of poverty, government investment in public schools, and the growth of the "New Class." Galbraith outlines the two types of poverty to better understand the causes and potential remedies. Case poverty is related to a specific individual and insular poverty is an island where nearly everyone is poor. To fund social programs, Galbraith believes in the expanded use of consumption taxes. The "New Class" consists of schoolteachers, professors, surgeons, and electrical engineers.

Galbraith ends the book with another appeal to the importance and need for investment in educating people:

Whether the problem be that of a burgeoning population and of space in which to live with peace and grace, or whether it be the depletion of the materials which nature has stocked in the earth’s crust and which have been drawn upon more heavily in this century than in all previous time together, or whether it be that of occupying minds no longer committed to the stockpiling of consumer goods, the basic demand on America will be on its resources of intelligence and education.

== See also ==
- History of economic thought
- Marshall Sahlins articulated in 1966 the theory that hunter-gatherers were the original affluent society.
