= Sweeting =

Sweeting is a surname. Notable people with the surname include:

- Bryce Sweeting (born 1994), Canadian lacrosse player
- Charles W. Sweeting (1854–1937), American politician
- Clay Sweeting (born 1985), Bahamian politician
- Marjorie Sweeting (1920–1994), British geomorphologist
- Rashad Sweeting (born 1990), Bahamian darts player
- Robert Sweeting (cyclist) (born 1987), American cyclist
- Robert Sweeting (politician), Bahamian politician
- Ryan Sweeting (born 1987), Bahamian tennis player
