= Robert Sweeting =

Robert Sweeting may refer to:

- Robert Sweeting (cyclist) (born 1987), American cyclist
- Robert Sweeting (politician), Bahamian politician
