= Clarks Mills =

Clarks Mills may refer to:

- Clarks Mills, New Jersey
- Clarks Mills, Wisconsin
