= Wisconsin Highway 148 =

Former state highway in Manitowoc County, Wisconsin, United States

State Trunk Highway 148

Route information
- Maintained by WisDOT
- Length: 5.7 mi (9.2 km)
- Existed: 1924–c. 1985

Major junctions
- South end: US 151 in Valders
- North end: US 10 in Cato

Location
- Country: United States
- State: Wisconsin
- Counties: Manitowoc

Highway system
- Wisconsin State Trunk Highway System; Interstate; US; State; Scenic; Rustic
← WIS 147	→ WIS 149

State Trunk Highway 148 (Highway 148, STH-148 or WIS 148) was a state highway in Manitowoc County, Wisconsin. It ran from US Highway 151 (US 151) and County Trunk Highway J (CTH-J) in Valders to US 10 in Cato.

== Route description ==
Starting at US 151/CTH-J in Valders, WIS 148 began to travel northward. Then, it passed through Clarks Mills. After that, it then traveled straight to US 10 in Cato. At this point, WIS 148 ended there, and the roadway continued as CTH-J.

== History ==
In 1924, WIS 148 was established along present-day CTH-J from WIS 31 (now part of US 151 since 1934) in Valders to WIS 18 (now part of US 10 since 1926) in Cato. During its existence, nothing significant has happened to the routing. Around 1985, WIS 148 was removed in favor of transferring this route to local control (replaced by CTH-J). There have been no WIS 148 designations ever since.

== Major intersections ==
The entire highway was in Manitowoc County.

Location	mi	km	Destinations	Notes
Valders	0.0	0.0	US 151	Southern terminus
Cato	5.7	9.2	US 10	Northern terminus
1.000 mi = 1.609 km; 1.000 km = 0.621 mi
