= Conspicuous expression =

Conspicuous expression or performative consumption are terms used to describe the act of doing something for the primary purpose of having someone see you do it. This is based on the concepts of conspicuous consumption, conspicuous leisure, and the performative turn.

This is similar to conspicuous consumption except that it does not involve buying anything. Additionally, rather than showing off wealth, conspicuous expression is used to show off social status. In other words, it is doing something for others to witness so that they think you are "cool".

== See also ==
- Hipster (contemporary subculture)
- Commodity fetishism
- Embeddedness
