= The Theory of the Leisure Class =

Book by Thorstein Veblen

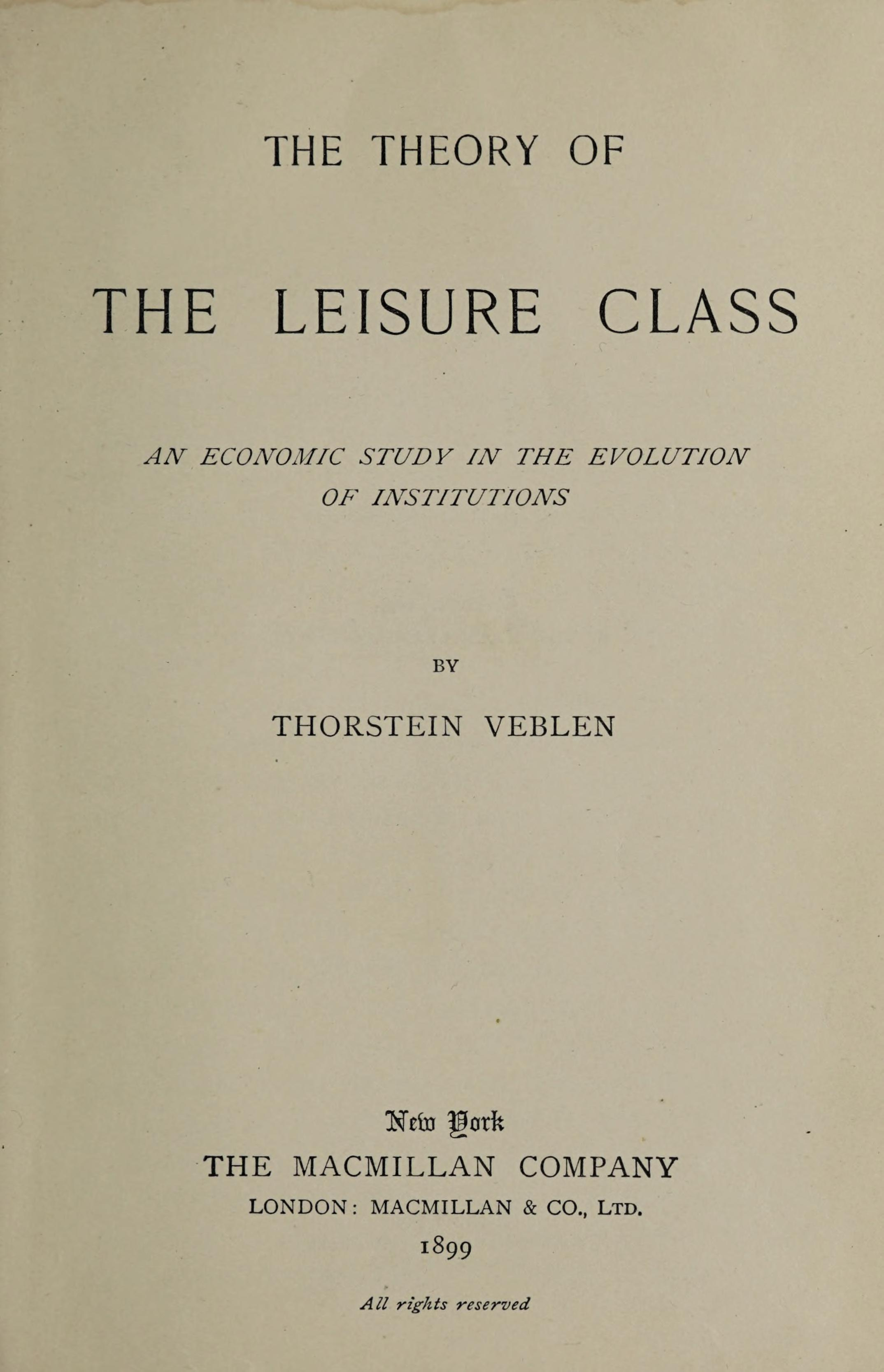
- Title page of the first edition
- Author: Thorstein Veblen
- Original title: The Theory of the Leisure Class: An Economic Study in the Evolution of Institutions
- Language: English
- Genre: Economics and sociology
- Publisher: Macmillan
- Publication date: 1899
- Publication place: United States
- Media type: book
- Pages: 400 pp
- OCLC: 17647347

The Theory of the Leisure Class: An Economic Study of Institutions (1899), by Thorstein Veblen, is a treatise of economics and sociology, and a critique of conspicuous consumption as a function of social class and of consumerism, which are social activities derived from the social stratification of people and the division of labor; the social institutions of the feudal period (9th–15th c.) that have continued to the modern era.

Veblen discusses how the pursuit and the possession of wealth affects human behavior, that the contemporary lords of the manor, the businessmen who own the means of production, have employed themselves in the economically unproductive practices of conspicuous consumption and conspicuous leisure, which are useless activities that contribute neither to the economy nor to the material production of the useful goods and services required for the functioning of society. Instead, it is the middle class and working class who are usefully employed in the industrialised, productive occupations that support the whole of society.

== Background ==
The Theory of the Leisure Class (1899) was published during the Gilded Age (1870–1900), the time of the robber baron millionaires John D. Rockefeller, Andrew Carnegie, and Cornelius Vanderbilt, at the end of the 19th century. Veblen presents the evolutionary development of the social and economic institutions of society, wherein technology and the industrial arts are the creative forces of economic production. In the economics of the production of goods and services, the social function of the economy was to meet the material needs of society and to earn profits for the owners of the means of production. Sociologically, the industrial production system required the workers (men and women) to be diligent, efficient, and co-operative, whilst the owners of the factories concerned themselves with profits and with public displays of wealth; thus the contemporary socio-economic behaviours of conspicuous consumption and of conspicuous leisure survived from the predatory, barbarian past of the tribal stage of modern society.

The sociology and economics reported in The Theory of the Leisure Class show the influences of Charles Darwin, Karl Marx, Adam Smith, and Herbert Spencer; thereby Veblen's socio-economic theory emphasizes social evolution and development as characteristics of human institutions. In his time, Veblen criticised contemporary (19th-century) economic theories as intellectually static and hedonistic, and that economists should take account of how people actually behave, socially and culturally, rather than rely upon the theoretical deduction meant to explain the economic behaviours of society. As such, Veblen's reports of American political economy contradicted the (supply and demand) neoclassical economics of the 18th century, which define people as rational agents who seek utility and maximal pleasure from their economic activities. In contrast, Veblen's economics defines people as irrational economic agents who disregard personal happiness in the continual pursuit of the social status and the prestige inherent to having a place in society (class and economic stratum). Veblen concluded that conspicuous consumption did not constitute social progress because American economic development was unduly influenced by the static economics of the British aristocracy; therefore, conspicuous consumption was an un-American activity contrary to the country's dynamic culture of individualism.

Originally published as The Theory of the Leisure Class: An Economic Study in the Evolution of Institutions, the book arose from three articles that Veblen published in the American Journal of Sociology between 1898 and 1899: (i) "The Beginning of Ownership" (ii) "The Barbarian Status of Women", and (iii) "The Instinct of Workmanship and the Irksomeness of Labour". These works presented the major themes of economics and sociology that he later developed in works such as: The Theory of Business Enterprise (1904), about how incompatible are the pursuit of profit and the making of useful goods; and The Instinct of Workmanship and the State of the Industrial Arts (1914), about the fundamental conflict between the human predisposition to useful production and the societal institutions that waste the useful products of human effort.

Moreover, The Theory of the Leisure Class is a socio-economic treatise that resulted from Veblen's observation and perception of the United States as a society of rapidly developing economic and social institutions. Critics of his reportage about the sociology and economics of the consumer society that is the US especially disliked the satiric tone of his literary style, and said that Veblen's cultural perspective had been negatively influenced by his austere boyhood in a Norwegian American community of practical, thrifty, and utilitarian people who endured anti-immigrant prejudices in the course of integration to American society.

== Thesis ==
In a stratified society, the profession of arms (military officer) is a leisure-class occupation.

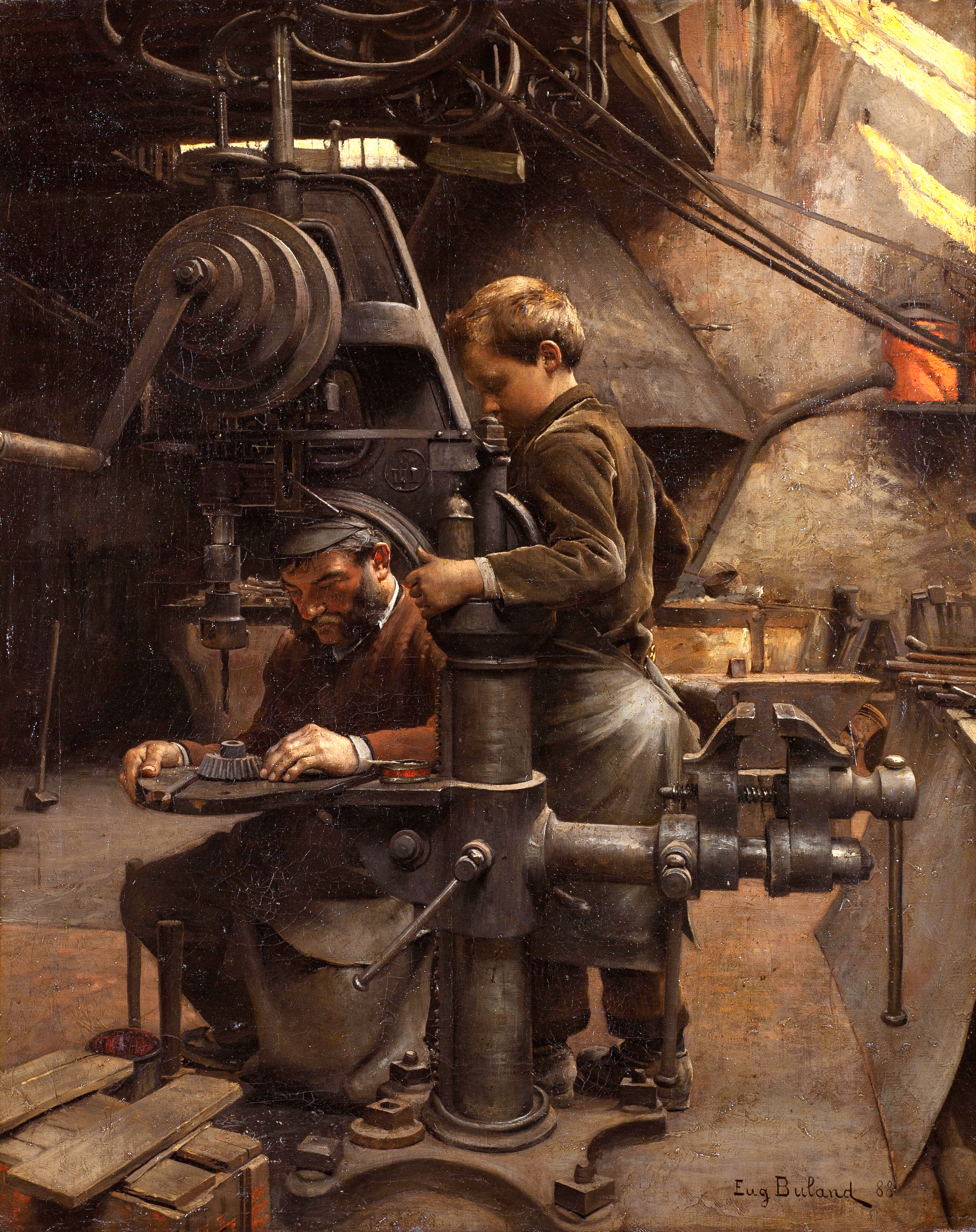
Manufacturing is an economically productive occupation for skilled-labor worker in a stratified society. (Un patron, by Jean-Eugène Buland, 1888)

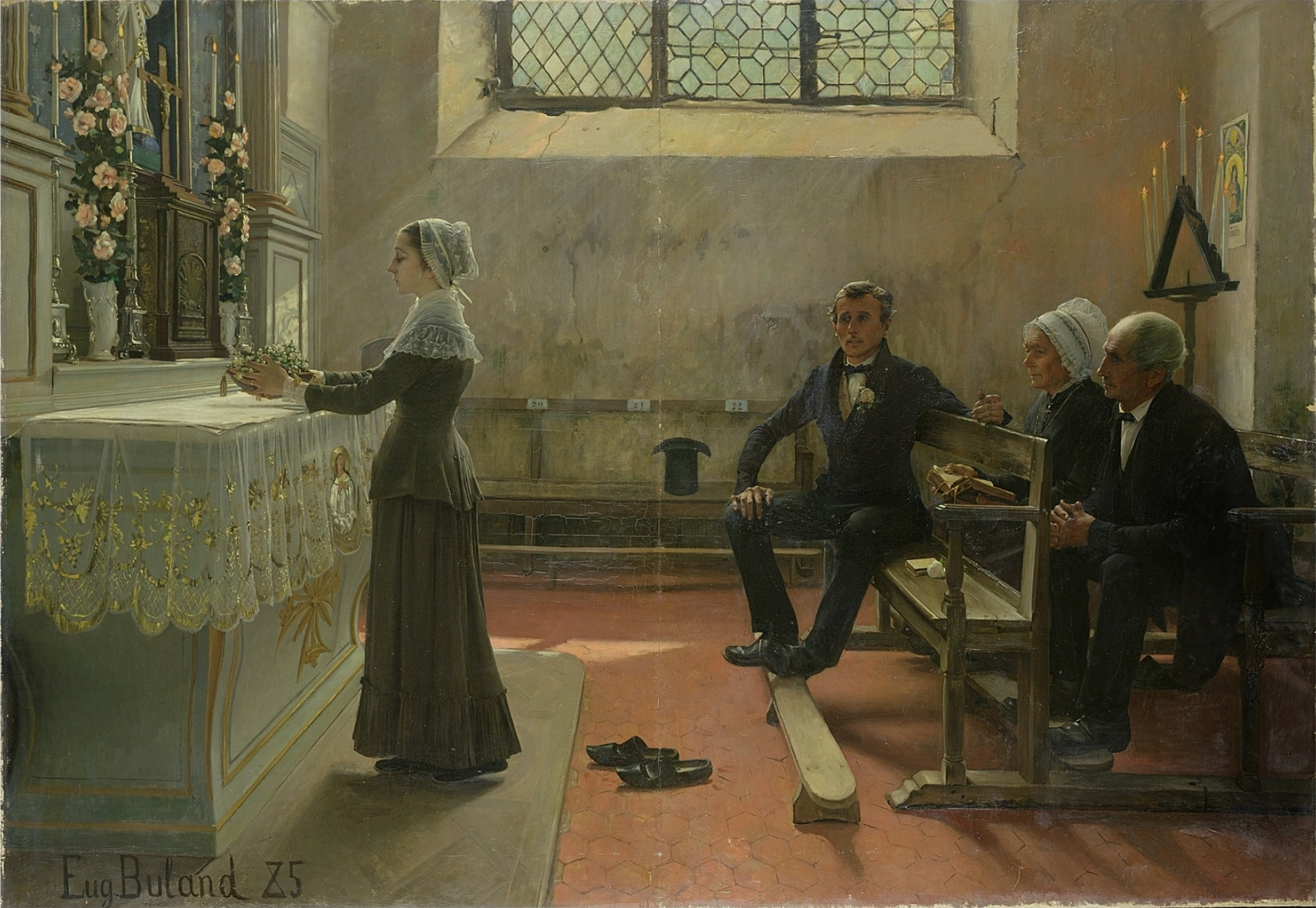
Conspicuous leisure: The devout observance of religious ritual is an activity for the leisure-class woman. (L'offrande, by Jean-Eugène Buland, 1885)

=== Concepts ===
In The Theory of the Leisure Class, Veblen coined the following sociological terms:

- Leisure class — members of the upper class who are exempt from productive work.
- Pecuniary superiority — the leisure class demonstrates their economic superiority by not working.
- Pecuniary emulation — the economic effort to exceed someone else's socio-economic status.
- Pecuniary struggle — the acquisition and exhibition of wealth to gain social status.
- Vicarious leisure — the leisure of wives and servants as evidence of the wealth of the lord of the manor
- Estranged leisure — the leisure of servants is realised on behalf of the lord of the manor.

=== The stratified society ===
The Theory of the Leisure Class established that the political economy of a modern society is based upon the social stratification of tribal and feudal societies, rather than upon the merit and social utility and economic utility of individual men and women. Veblen's examples indicate that many economic behaviours of contemporary society derive from corresponding tribal-society behaviours, wherein men and women practiced the division of labor according to their status group; high-status people practiced hunting and warfare, which are economically unproductive occupations, whilst low-status people practiced farming and manufacturing, which are economically productive occupations. In a socially stratified society, the leisure class are members of the upper class who are exempt from productive work.

==== (i) Occupation ====
The concepts of dignity and self-worth and honour are the bases of the development of social class and distinctions of type among the social classes; thus, by way of social stratification, productive labor came to be seen as disreputable. Therefore, the accumulation of wealth does not confer social status, whereas evidence of wealth, such as leisure, does. In a stratified society, the division of labor inherent to the barbarian culture of conquest, domination, and the exploitation of labour featured labour-intensive occupations for the conquered people, and light-labour occupations for the conquerors, who thus became the leisure class. In that societal context, although low-status, productive occupations (tinker, tailor, chandler) were of greater economic value to society than were high-status, unproductive occupations (the profession of arms, the clergy, banking, etc.), for social cohesion, the leisure class occasionally performed productive work that was more symbolic than practical.

The leisure class engaged in displays of pecuniary superiority by not working and by the:

1. Accumulation of property and material possessions
2. Accumulation of immaterial goods — high-level education, a family crest
3. Adoption of archaic social skills — manners and etiquette, chivalry and a code of conduct
4. Employment of servants

==== (ii) Economic utility ====
In exercising political control, the leisure class retained its high social status through direct and indirect coercion, by reserving for themselves the profession of arms, and by withholding weapons and military skills from the lower social classes. Such a division of labor (economic utility) rendered the lower classes dependent on the leisure class, which established, justified, and perpetuated the leisure class's role as the defenders of society against natural and supernatural enemies, since the clergy also belonged to the leisure class.

Contemporary society did not psychologically supersede the tribal-stage division of labor, but rather evolved it along lines of social status and stratum. During the Mediæval period (5th–15th c.), only land-owning noblemen had the right to hunt and to bear arms as soldiers; status and income were parallel. Likewise, in contemporary society, skilled laborers of the working class are paid an income in wages, which is inferior to the salary income paid to the educated managers whose economic importance (as engineers, salesmen, personnel clerks, et al.) is indirectly productive; income and status are parallel.

==== (iii) Pecuniary emulation ====
The term pecuniary emulation describes a person's economic efforts to surpass a rich person's socio-economic status. Veblen said that the pecuniary struggle to acquire and exhibit wealth, to gain status, is the driving force behind the development of culture and society. To attain, retain, and gain greater social status within their social class, low-status people emulate the high-status members of their socio-economic class, by consuming over-priced brands of goods and services perceived to be of better quality and thus of a higher social class. In striving for greater social status, people buy high-status goods and services they cannot afford, despite the availability of affordable products perceived as lower quality and of lesser social prestige, and thus of a lower social class. In a consumer society, the businessman was the latest member of the leisure class, a barbarian who used his prowess (business acumen) and competitive skills (marketing) to increase profits, by manipulating the supply and the demand among the social classes and their strata, for the same products (goods and services) at different prices.

=== Contemporary consumerism ===
- The subjugation of women — Women originally were spoils of war captured by raiding barbarians. In contemporary society, the unemployed housewife is an economic trophy that attests to a man's socio-economic prowess. In having a wife without an independent economic life (a profession, a trade, a job), a man can display her unemployed status as a form of his conspicuous leisure and as an object of his conspicuous consumption.
- The popularity of sport — American football is sociologically advantageous to community cohesion; yet, in itself, sport is an economic side-effect of conspicuous leisure that wastes material resources.
- Devout observances — Organized religion is a type of conspicuous leisure (wasted time) and of conspicuous consumption (wasted resources); a social activity of no economic consequence, because a church is an unproductive use of land and resources, and clergy (men and women) do unproductive work.
- Social formalities — social manners are remnant barbarian behaviours, such as paying respect to one's socially powerful betters. In itself, etiquette has little value (practical or economic), but is of much social value as cultural capital, which identifies, establishes, and enforces distinctions of place (social stratum) within a social class.

== Overview ==
=== Conspicuous economics ===
In order to gain and to hold the esteem of men it is not sufficient merely to possess wealth or power. The wealth or power must be put in evidence, for esteem is awarded only on evidence.

— Thorstein Veblen, The Theory of the Leisure Class

With The Theory of the Leisure Class: An Economic Study in the Evolution of Institutions (1899), Veblen introduced, described, and explained the concepts of "conspicuous consumption" and of "conspicuous leisure" to the nascent, academic discipline of sociology. Conspicuous consumption is the use of money and material resources to display a higher social status (e.g., silver flatware, custom-made clothes, an oversized house). Conspicuous leisure is the application of extended time to the pursuit of pleasure (physical and intellectual), such as sport and the fine arts. Therefore, such physical and intellectual pursuits display the freedom of the rich man and woman from having to work in an economically productive occupation.

=== Theses ===
- Chapter I: Introductory

The modern industrial society developed from the barbarian tribal society, which featured a leisure class supported by subordinated working classes employed in economically productive occupations. The people of the leisure class were exempt from manual work and economically productive occupations.

- Chapter II: Pecuniary Emulation

The emergence of a leisure class coincides with the beginning of ownership, initially based upon marriage as a form of ownership — of women and their chattel property — as evidence of prowess. As such, the material consumption of the leisure class has little to do with either comfort or subsistence, and much to do with social esteem from the community, and thus with self-respect.

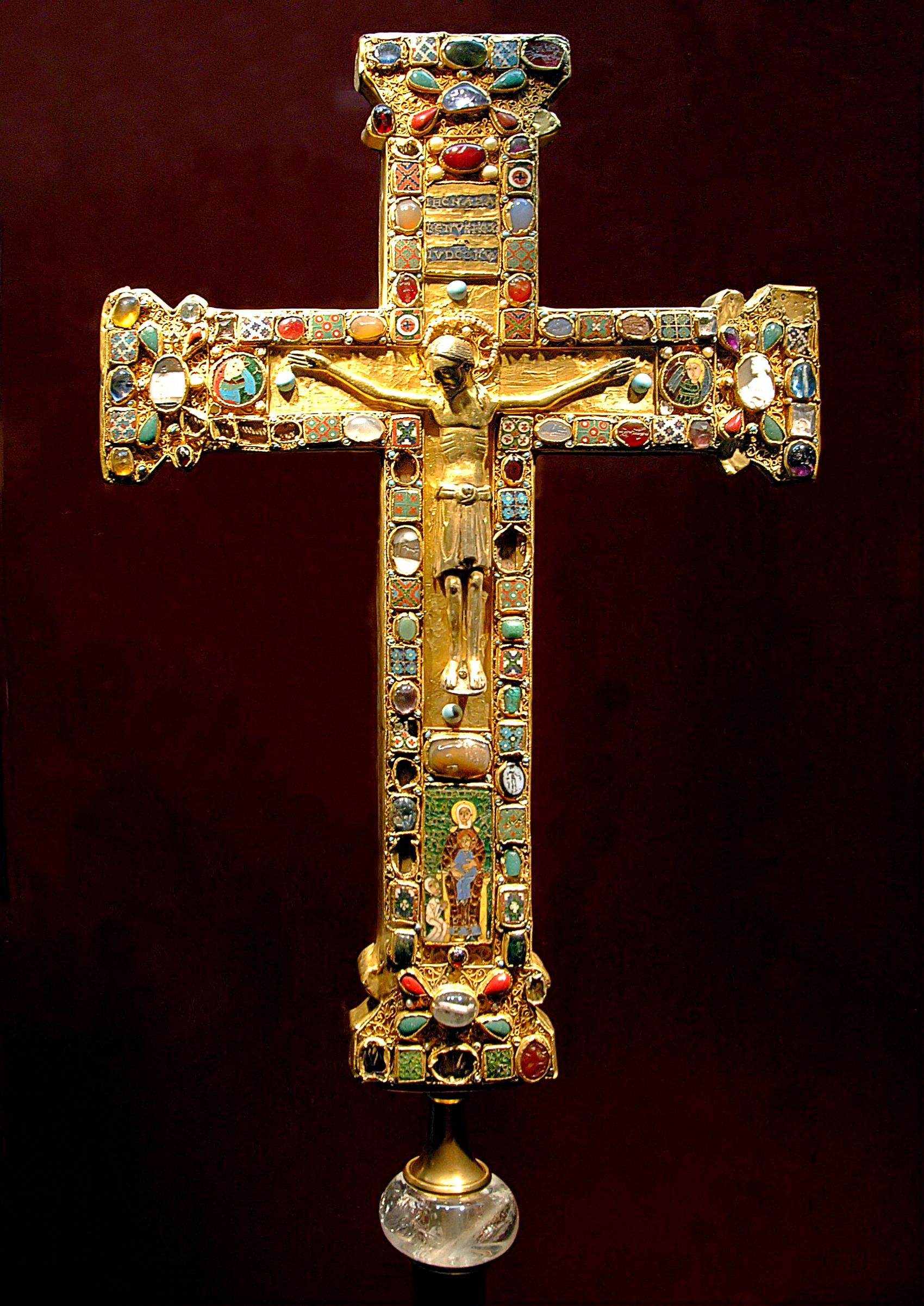
The pecuniary canons of taste of the leisure class ascribe monetary and æsthetic value to an objet d'art, such as The Cross of Mathilde (ca. AD 1000), which realises conspicuous leisure and conspicuous consumption in one object.

- Chapter III: Conspicuous Leisure

Among the lower social classes, a man's reputation as a diligent, efficient, and productive worker is the highest form of pecuniary emulation of the leisure class available to him in society. Yet, among the social strata of the leisure class, manual labor is perceived as a sign of social and economic weakness; thus, the defining social characteristics of the leisure class are the exemption from useful employment and the practice of conspicuous leisure as a non-productive consumption of time.

- Chapter IV: Conspicuous Consumption

Theoretically, the consumption of luxury products (goods and services) is limited to the leisure class, because the working classes have other, more important, things and activities on which to spend their limited income, their wages. Yet, such is not the case, because the lower classes consume expensive alcoholic beverages and narcotic drugs. In doing so, the working classes seek to emulate the standards of life and play of the leisure class, because they are the people at the head of the social structure in terms of reputability. In that emulation of the leisure class, social manners are a result of the non-productive consumption of time by the upper social classes; thus, the social utility of conspicuous consumption and of conspicuous leisure lies in their wastefulness of time and resources.

- Chapter V: The Pecuniary Standard of Living

In a society of industrialised production (of goods and services), the habitual consumption of products establishes a person's standard of living; therefore, it is more difficult to do without products than to continually add them to one's way of life. Moreover, once self-preservation (food and shelter) is achieved, the needs of conspicuous waste drive society's economic and industrial improvements.

- Chapter VI: Pecuniary Canons of Taste

To the leisure class, a material object becomes a product of conspicuous consumption when it is integrated into the canon of honorific waste by being regarded either as beautiful or worthy of possession for itself. Consequently, to the lower classes, possessing such an object becomes an exercise in the pecuniary emulation of the leisure class. Therefore, an objet d'art made of precious metal and gemstones is a more popular possession than is an object of art made of equally beautiful, but less expensive materials, because a high price can masquerade as beauty that appeals to the sense of social prestige of the possessor-consumer.

- Chapter VII: Dress as an Expression of the Pecuniary Culture

In a consumer society, the function of clothes is to define the wearer as a man or a woman belonging to a given social class, rather than to protect them from the environment. Clothing also indicates that the wearer's livelihood does not depend upon economically productive labor, such as farming and manufacturing, which activities require protective clothing. Moreover, the symbolic function of clothing indicates that the wearer belongs to the leisure class and can afford to buy new clothes as fashion changes.

- Chapter VIII: Industrial Exemption and Conservatism

A society develops through the establishment of institutions (social, governmental, economic, etc.), modified only in accordance with ideas from the past to maintain societal stability. Politically, the leisure class maintains its societal dominance by retaining outdated aspects of the political economy; thus, its opposition to socio-economic progressivism to the degree that they consider political conservatism, nationalism, and political reaction as honorific features of the leisure class.

- Chapter IX: The Conservation of Archaic Traits

The existence of the leisure class influences the behaviour of individual men and women through social ambition. To rise in society, a person from a lower class emulates the characteristics of the desired upper class; they assume the habits of economic consumption and social attitudes (archaic traits of demeanour in speech, dress, and manners). In pursuit of social advancement and concomitant social prestige, the man and the woman who rid themselves of scruple and honesty will more readily rise into a stratum of the leisure class.

- Chapter X: Modern Survivals of Prowess

As owners of the means of production, the leisure class benefit from, but do not work in, the industrial community, and do not materially contribute to the commonweal (the welfare of the public) but do consume the goods and services produced by the working classes. As such, the individual success (social and economic) of a person derives from their astuteness and ferocity, which are character traits nurtured by the pecuniary culture of the consumer society.

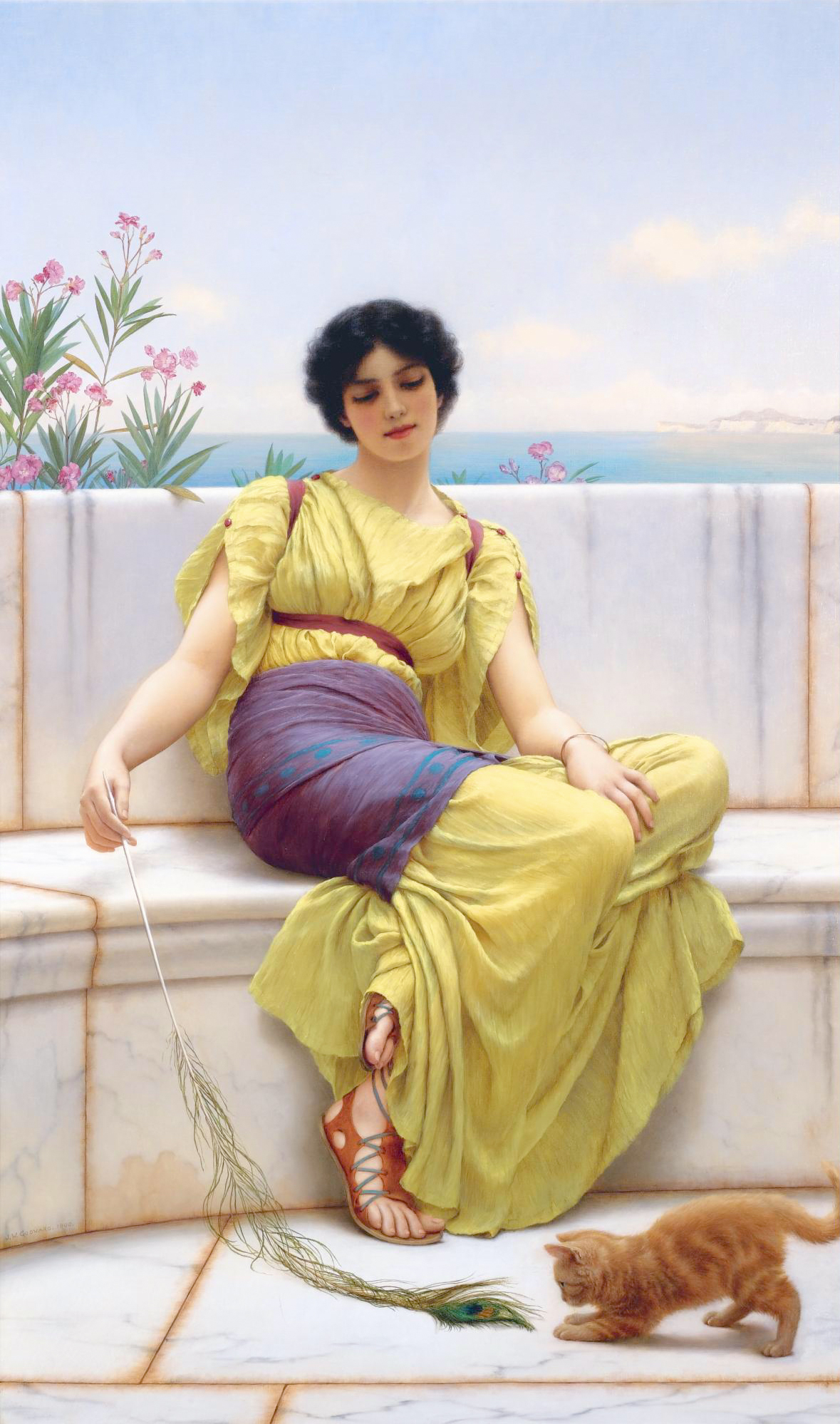
The leisure-class woman as subject and object of conspicuous consumption and conspicuous leisure: Idleness, by John William Godward, ca. 1900

- Chapter XI: The Belief in Luck

The belief in the concept of 'luck' (Fortuna) is one reason why people gamble; likewise, they follow the belief that luck is a part of achieving socio-economic success, rather than the likelier reason of social connections derived from a person's social class and social stratum. Within the social strata of the leisure class, the belief in luck is greater in the matter of sport (wherein physical prowess does matter) because of personal pride and the concomitant social prestige; hence, gambling is a display of conspicuous consumption and of conspicuous leisure. Nonetheless, gambling (the belief in luck) is a social practice common to all social classes.

- Chapter XII: Devout Observances

The existence, function, and practice of religion in a socially stratified society is a form of abstract conspicuous consumption for and among the members of the person's community, of devotion to the value system that justifies the existence of their social class. As such, attending church services, participating in religious rites, and paying tithes are forms of conspicuous leisure.

- Chapter XIII: Survivals of the Non-invidious Interest

The clergy and the women who are members of the leisure class function as objects of vicarious leisure; thus, it is morally impossible for them to work and productively contribute to society. As such, maintaining a high social class is more important for a woman of the leisure class than it is for a man of the leisure class. Women, therefore, are the greatest indicators of a man's socio-economic standing in his respective community. In a consumer society, how a woman spends her time and the activities she engages in communicate the social standing of her husband, her family, and her social class.

- Chapter XIV: The Higher Learning as an Expression of the Pecuniary Culture

Education (academic, technical, religious) is a form of conspicuous leisure because it does not directly contribute to society's economy. Therefore, high-status, ceremonial symbols of book-learning, such as the gown and mortar-board cap of the university graduate educated in abstract subjects (science, mathematics, philosophy, etc.), are greatly respected. In contrast, certificates, low-status, ceremonial symbols of practical schooling (technology, manufacturing, etc.), are not greatly respected to the same degree, because the contemporary university is a leisure-class institution.

== Criticism and critique ==
=== Literary style ===
In The Theory of the Leisure Class, Veblen used idiosyncratic and satirical language to identify, describe, and explain the consumerist mores of American modern society in the 19th century; thus, about the impracticality of etiquette as a form of conspicuous leisure, Veblen said:

A better illustration [of conspicuous leisure], or at least a more unmistakable one, is afforded by a certain King of France who was said to have lost his life in the observance of good form. In the absence of the functionary whose office it was to shift his master's seat, the King sat uncomplaining before the fire, and suffered his royal person to be toasted beyond recovery. But, in so doing, he saved his Most Christian Majesty from menial contamination.

In contrast, Veblen used objective language in The Theory of Business Enterprise (1904), which analyses the business-cycle behaviours of businessmen. In his introduction to the 1973 edition, the economist John Kenneth Galbraith said that The Theory of the Leisure Class is Veblen's intellectual put-down of American society. That Veblen spoke satirically to soften the negative implications of his socio-economic analyses of the U.S. social-class system, facts that are more psychologically threatening to the American ego and the status quo than the negative implications of Karl Marx's analyses. That, unlike Marx, who asserted capitalism as superior to feudalism in providing products (goods and services) for mass consumption, Veblen did not recognise such a distinction. For him, capitalism was one form of economic barbarism, and that goods and services produced for conspicuous consumption are fundamentally worthless.

In the Introduction to the 1967 edition of The Theory of the Leisure Class, economist Robert Lekachman said that Veblen was a misanthrope:

As a child, Veblen was a notorious tease, and an inveterate inventor of malicious nicknames. As an adult, Veblen developed this aptitude into the abusive category and the cutting analogy. In this volume [The Theory of the Leisure Class] the most striking categories are four in number: [i] Conspicuous Consumption, [ii] Vicarious Consumption, [iii] Conspicuous Leisure, and [iv] Conspicuous Waste. It is amazing what a very large proportion of social activity, higher education, devout observance, and upper-class consumer goods seemed to fit snugly into one, or another, of these classifications.

— Robert Lekachman, Introduction to The Theory of the Leisure Class (1967 ed.)

=== 19th century ===
The success of The Theory of the Leisure Class (1899) derived from the fidelity, veracity, and accuracy of Veblen's reportage about the socio-economic behaviours of the American system of social classes. Additional to the success (financial, academic, social) accrued to him by the book, a social-scientist colleague told Veblen that the sociology of gross consumerism catalogued in The Theory of the Leisure Class had much "fluttered the dovecotes of the East", especially in the Ivy League academic Establishment.

In the two-part book review "An Opportunity for American Fiction" (April–May 1899), the critic William Dean Howells made Veblen's treatise the handbook of sociology and economics for the American intelligentsia of the early 20th century. Reviewing first the economics and then the social satire in The Theory of the Leisure Class, Howells said that social-class anxiety impels American society to wasteful consumerism, especially the pursuit of social prestige. That despite social classes being alike in most stratified societies, the novelty of the American social-class system was that the leisure class had only recently appeared in U.S. history.

Asking for a novelist to translate into fiction what the social-scientist Veblen had reported, Howells concluded that a novel of manners was an opportunity for American fiction to accessibly communicate the satire in The Theory of the Leisure Class:

It would be easy to burlesque [the American leisure class], but to burlesque it would be intolerable, and the witness [Veblen] who did this would be bearing false testimony where the whole truth and nothing but the truth is desirable. A democracy, the proudest, the most sincere, the most ardent that history has ever known, has evolved here a leisure class which has all the distinguishing traits of a patriciate, and which by the chemistry of intermarriage with European aristocracies is rapidly acquiring antiquity. Is not this a phenomenon worthy the highest fiction? Mr. Veblen has brought to its study the methods and habits of scientific inquiry. To translate these into dramatic terms would form the unequalled triumph of the novelist who had the seeing eye and the thinking mind, not to mention the feeling heart. That such a thing has not been done hitherto is all the stranger, because fiction, in other countries, has always employed itself with the leisure class, with the aristocracy; and our own leisure class now offers not only as high an opportunity as any which fiction has elsewhere enjoyed, but by its ultimation in the English leisure class, it invites the American imagination abroad on conditions of unparalleled advantage.

In the Journal of Political Economy (September 1899), the book reviewer John Cummings said:

As a contribution to the general theory of sociology, Dr. Veblen's The Theory of the Leisure Class requires no other commendation for its scholarly performance than that which a casual reading of the work readily inspires. Its highly original character makes any abridgement of it exceedingly difficult and inadequate, and such an abridgement cannot be even attempted here ... The following pages, however, are devoted to a discussion of certain points of view in which the author seems, to the writer [Cummings], to have taken an incomplete survey of the facts, or to have allowed his interpretation of facts to be influenced by personal animus.

=== 20th century ===
In the essay "Prof. Veblen" (1919), the intellectual H. L. Mencken addressed the matters of Americans' social psychology reported in The Theory of the Leisure Class (1899), by asking:

Do I enjoy a decent bath because I know that John Smith cannot afford one—or because I delight in being clean? Do I admire Beethoven's Fifth Symphony because it is incomprehensible to Congressmen and Methodists—or because I genuinely love music? Do I prefer terrapin à la Maryland to fried liver, because plowhands must put up with the liver—or because the terrapin is intrinsically a more charming dose?

In the essay "The Dullest Book of The Month: Dr. Thorstein Veblen Gets the Crown of Deadly Nightshade" (1919), after addressing the content of The Theory of the Leisure Class, the book reviewer Robert Benchley addressed the subject of who are readers to whom Veblen speaks, that:

the Doctor has made one big mistake, however. He has presupposed, in writing this book, the existence of a [social] class with much more leisure than any class in the world ever possessed—for, has he not counted on a certain number of readers?

In the introduction to the 1934 edition, the economist Stuart Chase said that the Great Depression (1929–1941) had vindicated Veblen the economist, because The Theory of the Leisure Class had unified "the outstanding economists of the world". In the foreword to the 1953 edition, sociologist C. Wright Mills said that Veblen was "the best critic of America that America has ever produced". In the Introduction to the 1973 edition of the book, economist John Kenneth Galbraith addressed the author as subject, and said that Veblen was a man of his time, and that The Theory of the Leisure Class—published in 1899—reflected Veblen's 19th-century world view. That in his person and personality, the social scientist Veblen was neglectful of his grooming and tended to be disheveled; that he suffered social intolerance for being an intellectual and an agnostic in a society of superstitious and anti-intellectual people, and so tended to curtness with less intelligent folk.

John Dos Passos writes of Veblen in his trilogy novel U.S.A, in the third novel (1933), The Big Money. There, as one of Passos' highly subjective portraits of historical figures throughout the trilogy, Veblen is bio-sketched in THE BITTER DRINK in about 10 pages, referring presumably in that title to the hemlock Socrates was forced to drink for his supposed crimes. The portrait ends with these three final lines: "but his memorial remains/riveted into the language/the sharp clear prism of his mind."

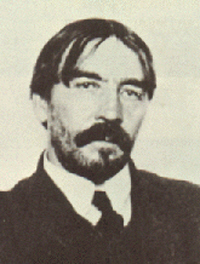
In The Theory of the Leisure Class, Veblen argues that the political economy of the U.S. is an imitation of the socio-economically static monarchy of Britain.

In The Worldly Philosophers: The Lives, Times, and Ideas of the Great Economic Thinkers (1953), the historian of economics Robert Heilbroner said that Veblen's socio-economic theories applied to the Gilded Age (1870–1900) of gross materialism and political corruption in the U.S. of the 19th century, but are inapplicable in 21st-century economics, because The Theory of the Leisure Class is specific to U.S. society in general, and to the society of Chicago in particular. In that vein, in No Rest for the Wealthy (2009), the journalist Daniel Gross said:

In the book, Veblen—whom C. Wright Mills called "the best critic of America that America has ever produced"—dissected the habits and mores of a privileged group that was exempt from industrial toil and distinguished by lavish expenditures. His famous phrase conspicuous consumption referred to spending that satisfies no need other than to build prestige, a cultural signifier intended to intimidate and impress. In this age of repossessed yachts, half-finished McMansions and broken-down leveraged buyouts, Veblen proves that a 110-year-old sociological vivisection of the financial overclass can still be au courant. Yet, while Veblen frequently reads as still 100 percent right on the foibles of the rich, when it comes to an actual theory of the contemporary leisure class, he now comes off as about 90 percent wrong.

== See also ==
- Affluenza
- Anti-consumerism
- Keeping up with the Joneses
- Downshifting (lifestyle)
- Frugality
- Over-consumption
- Signalling theory
- Simple living
- Veblen good
- Feminism
