= Thorstein Veblen =

American economist and sociologist (1857–1929)

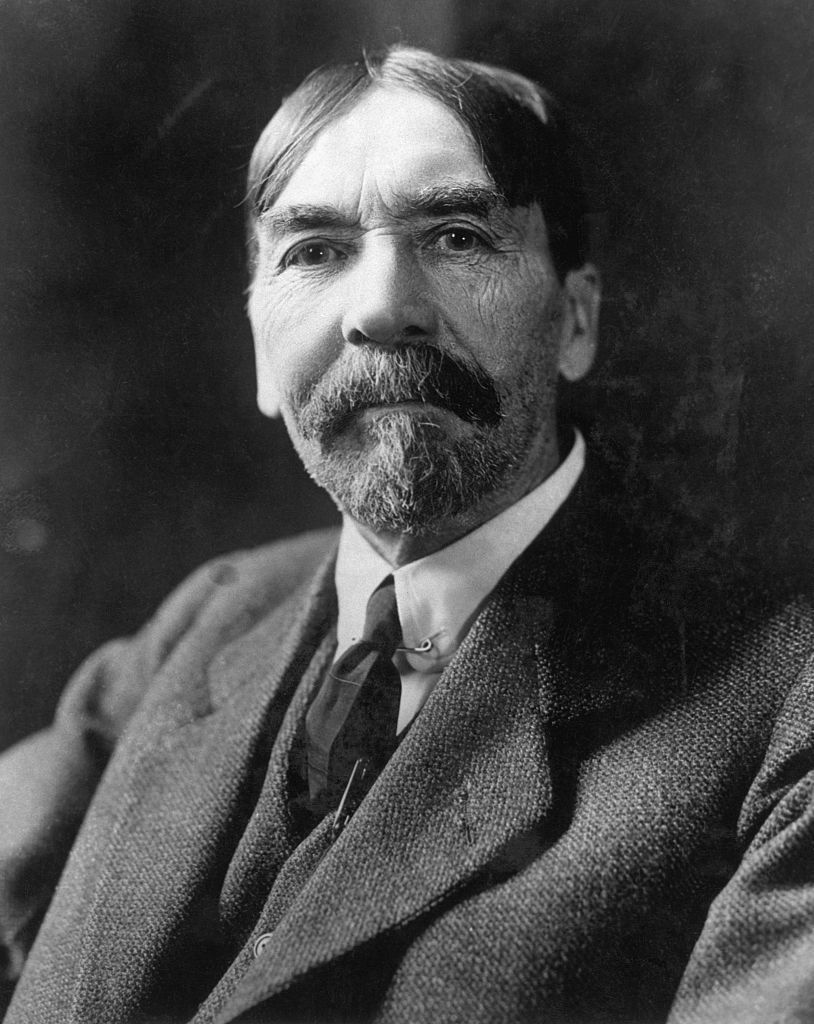
- Born: Thorstein Bunde Veblen; July 30, 1857; Cato, Wisconsin, U.S.
- Died: August 3, 1929 (aged 72); Menlo Park, California, U.S.

Academic background
- Education: Carleton College; Johns Hopkins University; Yale University; Cornell University
- Influences: Herbert Spencer, Thomas Paine, William Graham Sumner, Lester F. Ward, William James, Georges Vacher de Lapouge, Edward Bellamy, John Dewey, Gustav von Schmoller, John Bates Clark, Henri de Saint-Simon, Charles Fourier

Academic work
- Discipline: Economics, socioeconomics
- School or tradition: Institutional economics American Psychological School
- Institutions: Cornell University; University of Chicago; Stanford University; University of Missouri; The New School for Social Research
- Notable ideas: Conspicuous consumption, conspicuous leisure, trained incapacity, Veblenian dichotomy

Thorstein Bunde Veblen (/ˈθɔːrstaɪn ˈvɛblən/ THOR-styn VEH-blən; July 30, 1857 – August 3, 1929) was an American economist and sociologist who, during his lifetime, emerged as a well-known critic of capitalism. In his best-known book, The Theory of the Leisure Class (1899), Veblen coined the concepts of conspicuous consumption and conspicuous leisure. Veblen laid the foundation for the perspective of institutional economics. Contemporary economists still theorize Veblen's distinction between "institutions" and "technology", known as the Veblenian dichotomy.

As a leading intellectual of the Progressive Era in the US, Veblen attacked production for profit. His emphasis on conspicuous consumption greatly influenced economists who engaged in non-Marxist critiques of fascism, capitalism, and technological determinism.

== Biography ==
=== Early life and family background ===
Veblen was born on July 30, 1857, in Cato, Wisconsin, to Norwegian-American immigrant parents, Thomas Veblen and Kari Bunde. He was the sixth of twelve children.

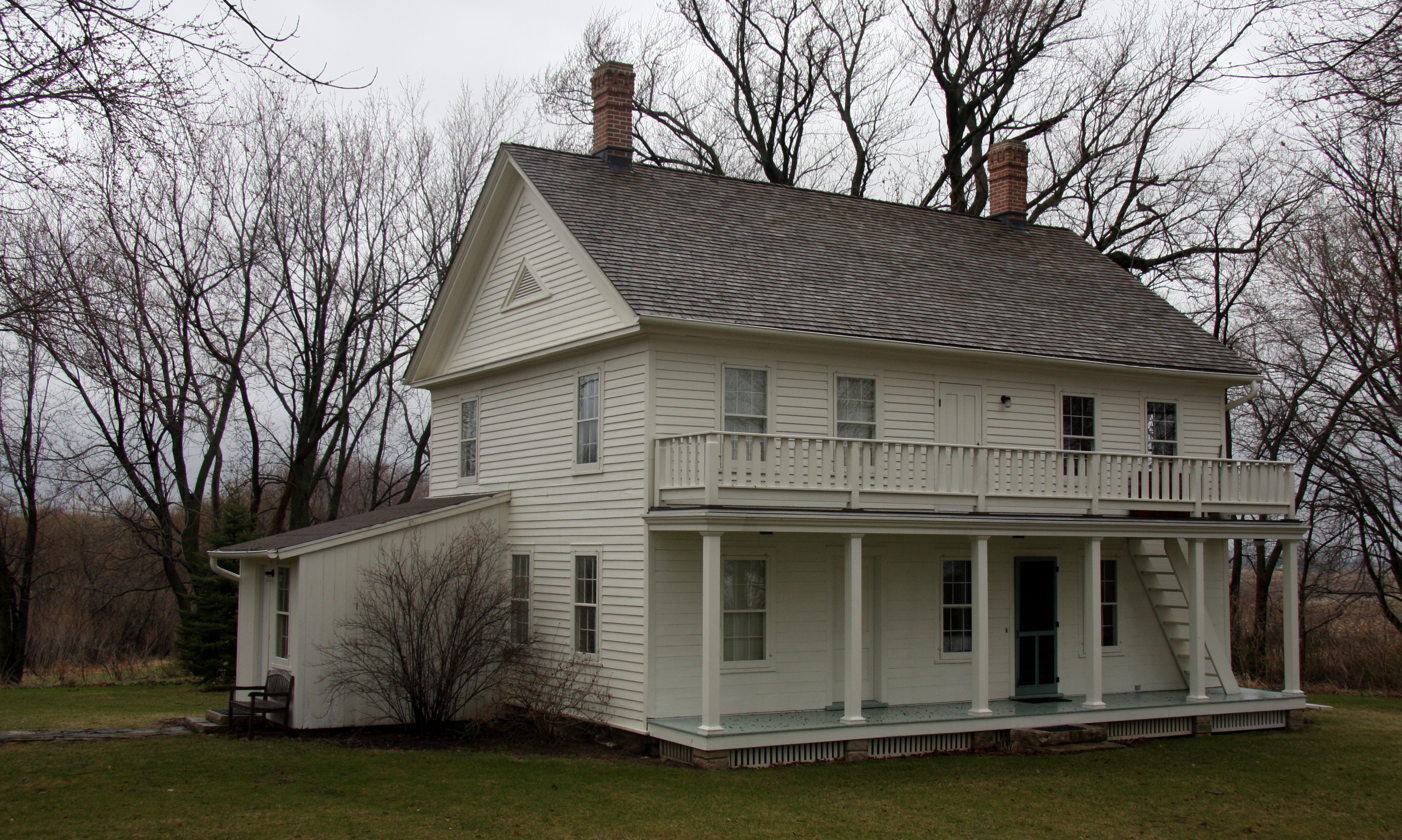
The Thorstein Veblen Farmstead in 2014

His parents had emigrated from Valdres, Norway, to Milwaukee, Wisconsin, on September 16, 1847, with few funds and no knowledge of English. They migrated to Milwaukee via Drammen, Hamburg and Quebec. The trip took four and a half months. Despite their limited circumstances as immigrants, Thomas Veblen's knowledge in carpentry and construction, paired with his wife's supportive perseverance, allowed them to establish a family farm in Rice County, Minnesota, where they moved in 1864. (The Veblen farmstead, located near the town of Nerstrand, became a National Historic Landmark in 1981.) Kari Bunde was not formally trained as a physician, but she frequently provided medical treatment to surrounding areas.

Veblen began his schooling at age five. Although Norwegian was his first language, he learned English from neighbors and at school. His parents also learned to speak English fluently, though they continued to read predominantly Norwegian literature with and around their family on the farmstead. The family farm eventually grew more prosperous, allowing Veblen's parents to provide their children with formal education. Unlike most immigrant children of the time, Veblen and all of his siblings received training in lower schools and went on to receive higher education at nearby Carleton College. Veblen's sister, Emily, was reputedly the first daughter of Norwegian immigrants to graduate from an American college. The eldest Veblen child, Andrew Veblen, ultimately became a professor of physics at the University of Iowa and the father of one of America's leading mathematicians, Oswald Veblen of Princeton University.

Several commentators saw Veblen's ethnic-Norwegian background and his relative "isolation from American society" in Minnesota as essential to the understanding of his writings. Harvard University sociologist David Riesman maintained that Veblen's background as a child of immigrants meant that Veblen was alienated from his parents' original culture, but that his "living in a Norwegian society within America" made him unable to "assimilate and accept the available forms of Americanism" completely. According to Stanford University historian George M. Fredrickson (1959), the "Norwegian society" that Veblen lived in (Minnesota) was so "isolated" that when he left it "he was, in a sense, emigrating to America."

=== Education ===
At age 17, in 1874, Veblen was sent to attend nearby Carleton College in Northfield, Minnesota. Veblen's parents had him enrolled in hopes that he would become a Lutheran minister, but in later years he was dismissive of all "anthropomorphic cults" and identified as agnostic. Early in his schooling he demonstrated both the bitterness and the sense of humor that would characterize his later works. Veblen studied economics and philosophy under the guidance of the young John Bates Clark (1847–1938), who went on to become a leader in the new field of neoclassical economics. Clark influenced Veblen greatly, and as Clark initiated him into the formal study of economics, Veblen came to recognize the nature and limitations of hypothetical economics that would begin to shape his theories. Veblen later developed an interest in the social sciences, taking courses within the fields of philosophy, natural history, and classical philology. Within the realm of philosophy, the works of Herbert Spencer (1820–1903) were of greatest interest to him, inspiring several preconceptions of socio-economics. In contrast, his studies in natural history and classical philology shaped his formal use of the disciplines of science and language respectively.

After Veblen graduated from Carleton in 1880, he traveled east to study philosophy at Johns Hopkins University. While at Johns Hopkins he studied under Charles Sanders Peirce (1839–1914). When he failed to obtain a scholarship there he moved on to Yale University, where he found economic support for his studies, obtaining a Doctor of Philosophy in 1884, with a major in philosophy and a minor in social studies. His dissertation was entitled Ethical Grounds of a Doctrine of Retribution. At Yale, he studied under renowned academics such as philosopher Noah Porter (1811–1892) and sociologist William Graham Sumner (1840–1910).

=== Marriages ===
The two primary relationships that Veblen had were with his two wives. Despite a reputation to the contrary, there is little evidence that he had sexual liaisons with other women.

During his time at Carleton College, Veblen met his first wife, Ellen Rolfe, the niece of the college president. They married in 1888. While some scholars have blamed alleged womanizing tendencies for the couple's numerous separations and eventual divorce in 1911, others have speculated that the relationship's demise was rooted in Ellen's inability to bear children. Following her death in 1926, it was revealed that she had asked for her autopsy to be sent to Veblen, her ex-husband. The autopsy showed that Ellen's reproductive organs had not developed normally, and she had been unable to bear children. A book written by Veblen's stepdaughter asserted that "this explained her disinterest in a normal wifely relationship with Thorstein" and that he "treated her more like a sister, a loving sister, than a wife".

Veblen married Ann Bradley Bevans, a former student, in 1914 and became stepfather to her two daughters, Becky and Ann. For the most part, it appears that they had a happy marriage. Ann was described by her daughter as a suffragette, a socialist, and a staunch advocate of unions and workers' rights. A year after he married Ann, they were expecting a child together, but the pregnancy ended in a miscarriage. Veblen never had any children of his own.

=== Later life ===
After his wife Ann's premature death in 1920, Veblen became active in the care of his stepdaughters. Becky went with him when he moved to California, looked after him there, and was with him at his death in August 1929. Prior to his death, Veblen had earned a comparatively high salary from the New School. Since he lived frugally, Veblen invested his money in California raisin vineyards and the stock market. However, after returning to northern California, Veblen lost the money he had invested and lived in a house on Sand Hill Road in Menlo Park (that once belonged to his first wife). Earning $500 to $600 a year from royalties and a yearly sum of $500 sent by a former Chicago student, he lived there until his death in 1929.

== Academic career ==
After graduation from Yale in 1884, Veblen was essentially unemployed for seven years. Despite having strong letters of recommendation, he was unable to obtain a university position. It is possible that his dissertation research on "Ethical Grounds of a Doctrine of Retribution" (1884) was considered undesirable. However, this possibility can no longer be meaningfully evaluated because Veblen's dissertation has been missing from Yale since 1935. Apparently the only scholar who ever studied the dissertation was Joseph Dorfman, for his 1934 book Thorstein Veblen and His America. Dorfman says only that the dissertation, advised by evolutionary sociologist William Graham Sumner, studies such evolutionary thought as that of Herbert Spencer, as well as the moral philosophy of Immanuel Kant. Also in 1884, Veblen wrote the first English-language study of Kant's third Critique, his Kant's Critique of Judgment, published in the July 1884 issue of the Journal of Speculative Philosophy. Some historians have also speculated that this failure to obtain employment was partially due to prejudice against Norwegians, while others attribute this to the fact that most universities and administrators considered him insufficiently educated in Christianity. Most academics at the time held divinity degrees, which Veblen did not have. Also, it did not help that Veblen openly identified as an agnostic, which was highly uncommon for the time. As a result, Veblen returned to his family farm, a stay during which he had claimed to be recovering from malaria. He spent those years recovering and reading voraciously. It is suspected that these difficulties in beginning his academic career later inspired portions of his book The Higher Learning in America (1918), in which he claimed that true academic values were sacrificed by universities in favor of their own self-interest and profitability.

In 1891, Veblen left the farm to return to graduate school to study economics at Cornell University under the guidance of economics professor James Laurence Laughlin. With the help of Professor Laughlin, who was moving to the University of Chicago, Veblen became a fellow at that university in 1892. Throughout his stay, he did much of the editorial work associated with the Journal of Political Economy, one of the many academic journals created during this time at the University of Chicago. Veblen used the journal as an outlet for his writings. His writings also began to appear in other journals, such as the American Journal of Sociology, another journal at the university. While he was mostly a marginal figure at the University of Chicago, Veblen taught several classes there.

In 1899, Veblen published his first and best-known book, titled The Theory of the Leisure Class. This did not immediately improve Veblen's position at the University of Chicago. He requested a raise after the completion of his first book, but this was denied.

Veblen's students at Chicago considered his teaching "dreadful". Stanford students considered his teaching style "boring", but this was more excused than some of Veblen's personal affairs. He offended Victorian sentiments with extramarital affairs while at the University of Chicago. At Stanford in 1909, Veblen was ridiculed again for being a womanizer and an unfaithful husband. As a result, he was forced to resign from his position, which made it very difficult for him to find another academic position. One story claims that he was fired from Stanford after Jane Stanford sent him a telegram from Paris, having disapproved of Veblen's support of Chinese workers in California. (The fact that Jane Stanford was already dead by 1905, while Veblen was appointed in 1906, casts doubt on this story.)

With the help of Herbert J. Davenport, a friend who was the head of the economics department at the University of Missouri, Veblen accepted a position there in 1911. Veblen, however, did not enjoy his stay at Missouri. This was in part due to his position as a lecturer being of lower rank than his previous positions and for lower pay. Veblen also strongly disliked Columbia, Missouri, the town where the university was located. Although he may not have enjoyed his stay at Missouri, in 1914 he did publish another of his best-known books, The Instincts of Worksmanship and the State of the Industrial Arts (1914). After World War I began, Veblen published Imperial Germany and the Industrial Revolution (1915). He considered warfare a threat to economic productivity and contrasted the authoritarian politics of Germany with the democratic tradition of Britain, noting that industrialization in Germany had not produced a progressive political culture.

By 1917, Veblen moved to Washington, D.C. to work with a group that had been commissioned by President Woodrow Wilson to analyze possible peace settlements for World War I, culminating in his book An Inquiry into the Nature of Peace and the Terms of Its Perpetuation (1917). This marked a series of distinct changes in his career path. Following that, Veblen worked for the United States Food Administration for a period of time. Shortly thereafter, Veblen moved to New York City to work as an editor for a magazine, The Dial. Within the next year, the magazine shifted its orientation and he lost his editorial position.

In the meantime, Veblen had made contacts with several other academics, such as Charles A. Beard, James Harvey Robinson, and John Dewey. The group of university professors and intellectuals eventually founded The New School for Social Research. Known today as The New School, in 1919 it emerged from American modernism, progressivism, and the democratic education movement. The group was open to students and aimed for a "an unbiased understanding of the existing order, its genesis, growth, and present working". From 1919 to 1926, Veblen continued to write and maintain a role in The New School's development. During this time, he wrote The Engineers and the Price System. In it, Veblen proposed a soviet of engineers. According to Yngve Ramstad, the view that engineers, not workers, would overthrow capitalism was a "novel view". Veblen invited Guido Marx to the New School to teach and to help organize a movement of engineers with others such as Morris Cooke; Henry Gantt, who had died shortly before; and Howard Scott. Cooke and Gantt were followers of Frederick Winslow Taylor's scientific management theory. Scott, who listed Veblen as being on the temporary organizing committee of the Technical Alliance, perhaps without consulting Veblen or other listed members, later helped found the technocracy movement.

== Influences on Veblen ==
American pragmatism distrusted the notion of the absolute, and instead recognized the notion of free will. Rather than God's divine intervention taking control of the happenings of the universe, pragmatism believed that people, using their free will, shape the institutions of society. Veblen also recognized this as an element of causes and effects, upon which he based many of his theories. This pragmatist belief was pertinent to the shaping of Veblen's critique of natural law and the establishment of his evolutionary economics, which recognized the purpose of man throughout. The skepticism of the German Historical School regarding laissez-faire economics was also adopted by Veblen.

From 1896 to 1926, he spent summers at his study cabin on Washington Island in Wisconsin. On the island he learned Icelandic, which allowed him to write articles accepted by an Icelandic newspaper and translate the Laxdæla saga into English.

== Contributions to social theory ==
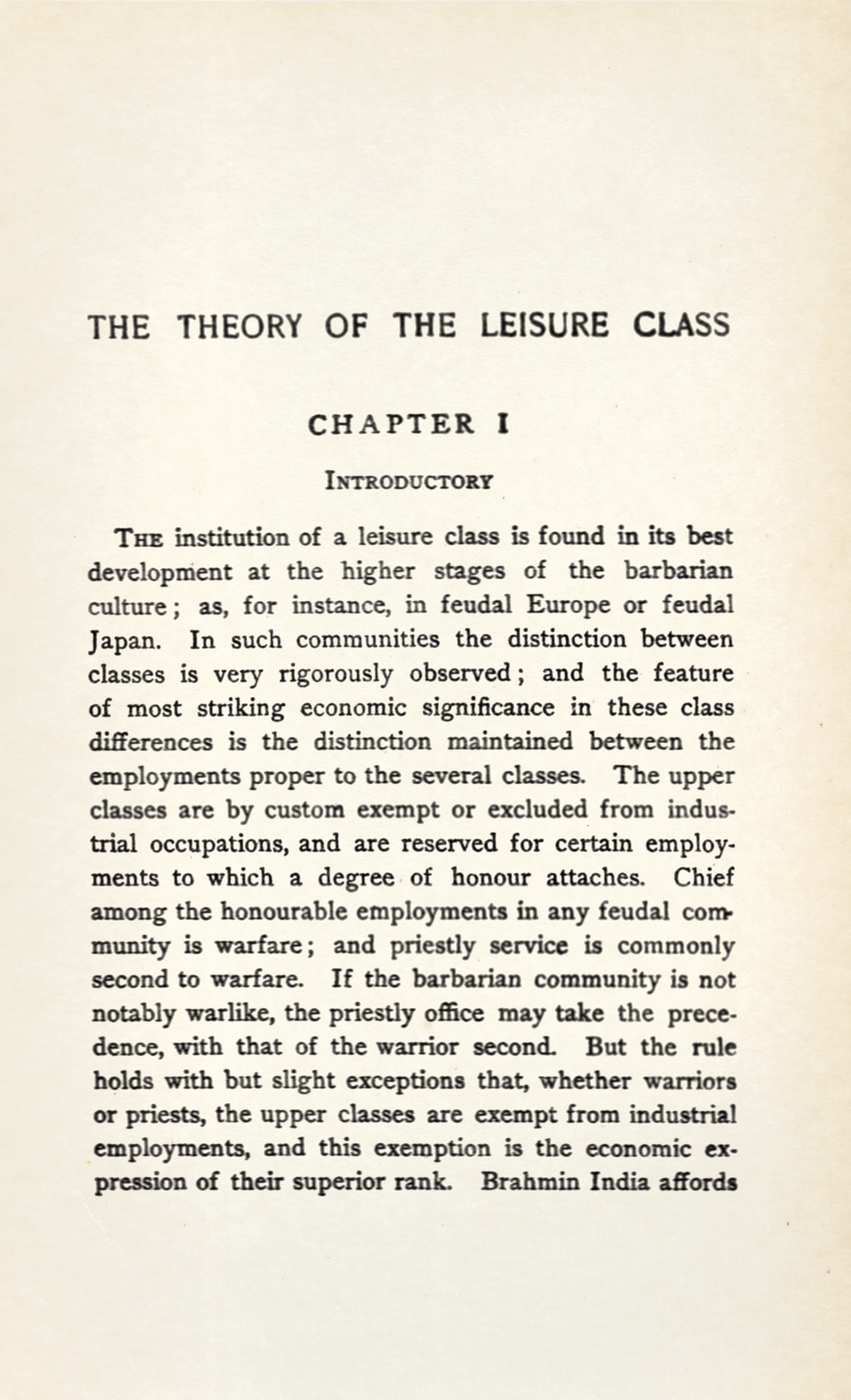
The Theory of the Leisure Class, 1924

=== Institutional economics ===
Thorstein Veblen laid the foundation for the perspective of institutional economics with his criticism of traditional static economic theory. As much as Veblen was an economist, he was also a sociologist who rejected his contemporaries who looked at the economy as an autonomous, stable, and static entity. Veblen disagreed with his peers, as he strongly believed that the economy was significantly embedded in social institutions. Rather than separating economics from the social sciences, Veblen examined the relationships between the economy and social and cultural phenomena. Generally speaking, the study of institutional economics viewed economic institutions as the broader process of cultural development. While economic institutionalism never transformed into a major school of economic thought, it allowed economists to explore economic problems from a perspective that incorporated social and cultural phenomena. It also allowed economists to view the economy as an evolving entity of bounded rationale.

=== Pecuniary emulation ===
Pecuniary emulation refers to the tendency of individuals to compete through the display of wealth and status symbols, rather than through productive or useful activities. Colloquially known as Keeping Up with the Joneses, this can take the form of luxury goods and services or the adoption of a luxury lifestyle. In The Theory of the Leisure Class, Veblen argues how emulation is at the basis of ownership. He says that individuals wish to emulate others, especially if they are of a higher social or pecuniary standing, so they initially begin acquiring the luxury goods that others have acquired. Eventually, the act of conspicuous consumption becomes the symbol of status, rather than the individual. This pecuniary emulation drives consumers to spend more on displays of wealth and status symbols, as opposed to more useful commodities. This cycle of constant emulation promotes materialism, demotes other forms of fulfillment, and negatively impacts the consumer's decision-making process within the market.

=== Conspicuous consumption ===
In his most famous work, The Theory of the Leisure Class, Veblen writes critically of the leisure class for its role in fostering wasteful consumption, or conspicuous waste. In this first work Veblen coined the term conspicuous consumption, which he defined as spending more money on goods than they are worth.

The term originated during the Second Industrial Revolution when a nouveau riche social class emerged as a result of the accumulation of capital wealth. He explains that members of the leisure class, often associated with business, are those who also engage in conspicuous consumption to impress the rest of society through the manifestation of their social power and prestige, be it real or perceived. In other words, social status, Veblen explained, becomes earned and displayed by patterns of consumption rather than what the individual makes financially. Subsequently, people in other social classes are influenced by this behavior and, as Veblen argued, strive to emulate the leisure class. What results from this behavior, is a society characterized by the waste of time and money. Unlike other sociological works of the time, The Theory of the Leisure Class focused on consumption, rather than production.

=== Conspicuous leisure ===
Conspicuous leisure, or the non-productive use of time for the sake of displaying social status, is used by Veblen as the primary indicator of the leisure class. To engage in conspicuous leisure is to openly display one's wealth and status, as productive work signified the absence of pecuniary strength and was seen as a mark of weakness. As the leisure class increased their exemption from productive work, that very exemption became honorific and actual participation in productive work became a sign of inferiority. Conspicuous leisure worked very well to designate social status in rural areas, but urbanization made it so that conspicuous leisure was no longer a sufficient means to display pecuniary strength. Urban life requires more obvious displays of status, wealth, and power, which is where conspicuous consumption becomes prominent.

=== Leisure class ===
In The Theory of the Leisure Class, Veblen writes critically of conspicuous consumption and its function in social-class consumerism and social stratification. Reflecting historically, he traces said economic behaviors back to the beginnings of the division of labor, or during tribal times. Upon the start of a division of labor, high-status individuals within the community practiced hunting and war, notably less labor-intensive and less economically productive work. Low-status individuals, on the other hand, practiced activities recognized as more economically productive and more labor-intensive, such as farming and cooking. High-status individuals, as Veblen explains, could instead afford to live their lives leisurely (hence their title as the leisure class), engaging in symbolic economic participation, rather than practical economic participation. These individuals could engage in conspicuous leisure for extended periods of time, simply following pursuits that evoked a higher social status. Rather than participating in conspicuous consumption, the leisure class lived lives of conspicuous leisure as a marker of high status. The leisure class protected and reproduced their social status and control within the tribe through, for example, their participation in war-time activities, which while they were rarely needed, still rendered their lower social class counterparts dependent upon them. During modern industrial times, Veblen described the leisure class as those exempt from industrial labor. Instead, he explains, the leisure class participated in intellectual or artistic endeavors to display their freedom from the economic need to participate in economically productive manual labor. In essence, not having to perform labor-intensive activities did not mark higher social status, but rather, higher social status meant that one would not have to perform such duties.

==== Assessment of the rich ====
Veblen expanded upon Adam Smith's assessment of the rich, stating that "[t]he leisure class used charitable activities as one of the ultimate benchmarks of the highest standard of living." Veblen insinuates that the way to convince those who have money to share is to have them receive something in return. Behavioral economics also reveals that rewards and incentives are very important aspects of every-day decision making. When the rich shift their mindset from feeling as though they are forced to give their hard-earned money to feeling pride and honor from giving to charitable organizations there is benefit for every party involved. In The Theory of the Leisure Class (1899), Veblen referred to communities without a leisure class as "non-predatory communities," and stated that "[t]he accumulation of wealth at the upper end of the pecuniary scale implies privation at the lower end of the scale." Veblen believed that inequality was natural, and that it gave housewives something to focus their energy on. The members of the leisure class planning events and parties did not actually help anyone in the long run, according to Veblen.

=== Theory of business enterprise ===
The central problem for Veblen was the friction between "business" and "industry".

Veblen identified business as the owners and leaders whose primary goal was the profits of their companies but who, in an effort to keep profits high, often made efforts to limit production. By obstructing the operation of the industrial system in that way, "business" negatively affected society as a whole (through higher rates of unemployment, for example). With that said, Veblen identified business leaders as the source of many problems in society, which he felt should be led by people such as engineers, who understood the industrial system and its operation, while also having an interest in the general welfare of society at large.

=== Trained incapacity ===
In sociology, trained incapacity is "that state of affairs in which one's abilities function as inadequacies or blind spots." It means that people's past experiences can lead to wrong decisions when circumstances change.

Veblen coined this phrase in 1914, in The Instinct of Workmanship and the Industrial Arts. Essayist Kenneth Burke expanded upon the theory of trained incapacity later on, first in his book Permanence and Change (1935) and again in two later works.

== Veblen's economics and politics ==
Veblen and other American institutionalists were indebted to the German Historical School, especially Gustav von Schmoller, for the emphasis on historical fact, their empiricism and especially a broad, evolutionary framework of study. Veblen admired Schmoller, but criticized some other leaders of the German school because of their over-reliance on descriptions, long displays of numerical data, and narratives of industrial development that rested on no underlying economic theory. Veblen tried to use the same approach with his own theory added.

Veblen developed a 20th-century evolutionary economics based upon Darwinian principles and new ideas emerging from anthropology, sociology, and psychology. Unlike the neoclassical economics that emerged at the same time, Veblen described economic behavior as socially determined and saw economic organization as a process of ongoing evolution. Veblen rejected any theory based on individual action or any theory highlighting any factor of an inner personal motivation. He considered such theories to be "unscientific". This evolution was driven by the human instincts of emulation, predation, workmanship, parental bent, and idle curiosity. Veblen wanted economists to grasp the effects of social and cultural change on economic changes. In The Theory of the Leisure Class, the instincts of emulation and predation play a major role. People, rich and poor alike, attempt to impress others and seek to gain advantage through what Veblen termed "conspicuous consumption" and the ability to engage in "conspicuous leisure." In this work Veblen argued that consumption is used as a way to gain and signal status. Through "conspicuous consumption" often came "conspicuous waste," which Veblen detested. He further spoke of a "predatory phase" of culture in the sense of the predatory attitude having become the habitual spiritual attitude of the individual.

=== Political theories ===
Politically, Veblen was sympathetic to state ownership. Scholars disagree about the extent to which Veblen's views are compatible with Marxism, socialism, or anarchism. Veblen was against Marxism.

=== Veblenian dichotomy ===
The Veblenian dichotomy is a concept that Veblen first suggested in The Theory of the Leisure Class (1899), and made fully into an analytical principle in The Theory of Business Enterprise (1904). To Veblen, institutions determine how technologies are used. Some institutions are more "ceremonial" than others. A project for Veblen's idealized economist is to identify institutions that are too wasteful and pursue institutional "adjustment" to make instituted uses of technology more "instrumental".

Veblen defines "ceremonial" as related to the past, supportive of "tribal legends" or traditional conserving attitudes and conduct; while the "instrumental" orients itself toward the technological imperative, judging value by the ability to control future consequences.

The theory suggests that, although every society depends on tools and skills to support the life process, every society also appears to have a "ceremonial" stratified structure of status that runs contrary to the needs of the "instrumental" (technological) aspects of group life. The Veblen Dichotomy is still very relevant today and can be applied to thinking around digital transformation.

Veblen proposed that engineers be a revolutionary class leading a technocratic society; the emphasis of this new society would be that of efficiency and care for the future welfare of society as opposed to the focus on social status and financial gain in a capitalist system. He called this revolutionary class of engineers the Soviet of Technicians and believed it was a solution to the leisure class's control of the means of production and the dichotomy between the ceremonial and instrumental institutions. Veblen was accused of technological determinism because of his stance on a technocratic society; however, he denied this. Veblen was more concerned with the rise of the corporations as opposed to being totally in favor of industrial advancement.

To Veblen, the engineer is guided by instrumental institutions and is influenced to develop systems and infrastructure that bring about Veblen's imagined technocracy. Veblen's work has been influential in debates about industrial planning and technocracy.

Later in life, Veblen became suspicious of technology. In his book The Instinct of Workmanship, he viewed the instinctive drive to produce better technology as a blind force that was making the world less human.

=== Publications on "The Blond Race" and "Aryan Culture" ===
Historiographical debates continue over Veblen's commissioned 1913 writings on "the blond race" and "the Aryan culture" in the context of cultural and social anthropology. Mendelian concepts shaped both his praise of cultural anthropology and critique of social anthropology, as well as his contrasts between Mendelian and Darwinian ideas in antediluvian racial typologies such as "dolicho-blond" and "brachycephalic brunet." Historians argue that Veblen preferred melting pot ideas as well as his own approach to monoculturalism and cultural evolution in cultural anthropology. Many, if not most, of these historical studies, as well as scholarly appraisals of his 1915–19 articles on Japanese industrial expansion and the distinct politics of the Jews, maintain strict distinctions between Veblen's renunciation of "invidious" scientific racism and Veblen's eurocentric assumptions, if any.

== Legacy ==
Veblen is regarded as one of the co-founders of the American school of institutional economics, alongside John R. Commons and Wesley Clair Mitchell. Economists who adhere to this school organize themselves in the Association for Institutional Economics (AFIT). The Association for Evolutionary Economics (AFEE) gives an annual Veblen-Commons award for work in Institutional Economics and publishes the Journal of Economic Issues. Some unaligned practitioners include theorists of the concept of "differential accumulation."

Veblen's work has remained relevant for more reasons than the phrase "conspicuous consumption." His evolutionary approach to the study of economic systems is again gaining traction and his model of recurring conflict between the existing order and new ways can be of value in understanding the new global economy. In this sense some authors have recently compared the Gilded Age, studied by Veblen, with the New Gilded Age and the contemporary processes of refeudalization, arguing for a new global leisure class and distinctive luxury consumption.

Veblen has been cited in the writings of feminist economists. Veblen refused to accept the traditional view of the role and function of women. He theorized that women in the industrial age remained victims of their "barbarian status". This has, in hindsight, made Veblen a forerunner of modern feminism.

Veblen's work has also often been cited in American literary works. He is featured in The Big Money by John Dos Passos, and mentioned in Carson McCullers' The Heart Is a Lonely Hunter and Sinclair Lewis' Main Street. One of Veblen's PhD students was George W. Stocking Sr., a pioneer in the emerging field of industrial organization economics. Another was Canadian academic and author Stephen Leacock, who went on to become the head of Department of Economics and Political Science at McGill University in Montreal. The influence of Theory of the Leisure Class can be seen in Leacock's 1914 satire, Arcadian Adventures with the Idle Rich.

Veblen's writings have also drawn criticism. In 1919, H. L. Mencken published The American Language, partly a critique of linguistic prescription in studies of British English, partly a defense of linguistic prescription in American English. That same year, he wrote that Veblen's works were "incomparably tangled and unintelligible," and that "in brief, he stated his hollow nothings in such high, astounding terms that inevitably arrested and blistered the right-thinking mind." Veblen "started off with a gratuitous and highly dubious assumption, proceeded to an equally dubious deduction, and then ended with a platitude which begged the whole question." In the same essay, Mencken revived his criticism of "socialist" authors, yet protested the deportation of immigrant "socialists" during the First Red Scare. At the height of Roaring Twenties conceptions of "liberal and enlightened countries", Mencken subsequently reflected on the events of 1919 as "indicative of the strength of capitalism under democracy", celebrating the divide-and-conquer results of conflict between those he previously labeled "Veblenists" and those who cited praise and protection of American English as reasons to undermine civil liberties. Mencken then articulated a premise underpinning his shifting ideas: only the "Democratic man can understand the aims and aspirations of capitalism."

Veblen goods are named for him, based on his work in The Theory of the Leisure Class.

== Selected bibliography ==
=== Published books ===
- 1899. The Theory of the Leisure Class: An Economic Study of Institutions. New York: Macmillan. Available at the Internet Archive and Project Gutenberg.
- 1904. The Theory of Business Enterprise. New York: Charles Scribner's Sons.
- 1914. The Instinct of Workmanship and the State of the Industrial Arts. New York: Macmillan.
- 1915. Imperial Germany and the Industrial Revolution. New York: Macmillan.
- 1917. An Inquiry into the Nature of Peace and the Terms of Its Perpetuation. New York: Macmillan. Also available at Project Gutenberg.
- 1918. The Higher Learning in America: A Memorandum on the Conduct of Universities by Business Men. New York: B. W. Huebsch.
- 1919. The Place of Science in Modern Civilisation and Other Essays. New York: B. W. Huebsch. Also available at Project Gutenberg and in PDF.
- 1919. The Vested Interests and the Common Man. New York: B. W. Huebsch.
- 1921. The Engineers and the Price System. New York: B. W. Huebsch.
- 1923. Absentee Ownership and Business Enterprise in Recent Times: The Case of America. New York: B. W. Huebsch.

=== Articles ===
- 1884. "Kant's Critique of Judgement." Journal of Speculative Philosophy.
- 1891. "Some Neglected Points in the Theory of Socialism." Annals of AAPSS. JSTOR 1008995.
- 1892. "Bohm-Bawerk's Definition of Capital and the Source of Wages." Quarterly Journal of Economics (QJE).
- 1892. "The Overproduction Fallacy." QJE. JSTOR 1882520.
- 1893. "The Food Supply and the Price of Wheat", Journal of Political Economy (JPE). JSTOR 1817524.
- 1894. "The Army of the Commonweal." JPE. JSTOR 1819238
- 1894. "The Economic Theory of Women's Dress." Popular Science Monthly.
- 1896. "Review of Karl Marx's 'Poverty of Philosophy'." JPE.
- 1897. "Review of Werner Sombart's 'Sozialismus'." JPE.
- 1898. "Review of Gustav Schmoller's 'Über einige Grundfragen der Sozialpolitik'." JPE.
- 1898. "Review of Turgot's 'Reflections'." JPE.
- 1898. "Why is Economics Not an Evolutionary Science?" QJE.
- 1898. "The Beginnings of Ownership." American Journal of Sociology (AJS).
- 1898. "The Instinct of Workmanship and the Irksomeness of Labor." AJS.
- 1898. "The Barbarian Status of Women." AJS.
- 1899–1900. "The Preconceptions of Economic Science," Part 1, Part 2, Part 3. QJE.
- 1901. "Industrial and Pecuniary Employments." Publications of the AEA. JSTOR 2485814.
- 1901. "Gustav Schmoller's 'Economics'." QJE. JSTOR 1882903.
- 1902. "Arts and Crafts." JPE. JSTOR 1822624.
- 1903. "Review of Werner Sombart's 'Der moderne Kapitalismus'." JPE. JSTOR 1817297.
- 1903. "Review of J.A. Hobson's Imperialism", JPE. in JSTOR
- 1904. "An Early Experiment in Trusts", JPE. in JSTOR
- 1904. "Review of Adam Smith's Wealth of Nations", JPE. in JSTOR
- 1905. "Credit and Prices", JPE. in JSTOR
- 1906. "The Place of Science in Modern Civilization", AJS. in JSTOR
- 1906. "Professor Clark's Economics", QJE. in JSTOR
- 1906–1907. "The Socialist Economics of Karl Marx and His Followers", QJE. on marxists.org
- 1907. "Fisher's Capital and Income", Political Science Quarterly.
- 1908. "On the Nature of Capital" QJE. in JSTOR
- 1909. "Fisher's Rate of Interest." Political Science Quarterly.
- 1909. "The Limitations of Marginal Utility." JPE. in JSTOR
- 1910. "Christian Morals and the Competitive System", International J of Ethics. in JSTOR
- 1913. "The Mutation Theory and the Blond Race", Journal of Race Development. in JSTOR
- 1913. "The Blond Race and the Aryan Culture", Univ of Missouri Bulletin.
- 1915. "The Opportunity of Japan", Journal of Race Development. in JSTOR
- 1918. "On the General Principles of a Policy of Reconstruction", J of the National Institute of Social Sciences.
- 1918. "Passing of National Frontiers", Dial.
- 1918. "Menial Servants during the Period of War", Public.
- 1918. "Farm Labor for the Period of War", Public.
- 1918. "The War and Higher Learning", Dial.
- 1918. "The Modern Point of View and the New Order", Dial.
- 1919. "The Intellectual Pre-Eminence of Jews in Modern Europe", Political Science Quarterly. in JSTOR
- 1919. "On the Nature and Uses of Sabotage", Dial.
- 1919. "Bolshevism is a Menace to the Vested Interests", Dial.
- 1919. "Peace", Dial.
- 1919. "The Captains of Finance and the Engineers", Dial.
- 1919. "The Industrial System and the Captains of Industry", Dial.
- 1920. "Review of J.M.Keynes' Economic Consequences of the Peace, Political Science Quarterly.
- 1925. "Economic theory in the Calculable Future", AER.
- 1925. "Introduction" in The Laxdæla saga.

== See also ==
- Affluenza
- Anti-consumerism
- Mottainai
- Simple living
