= Charles W. Sweeting =

American politician

Charles W. Sweeting (September 27, 1854 – April 17, 1937) was an American businessman and politician.

Born in Syracuse, New York, Sweeting moved to Plymouth, Wisconsin in 1878 and then to Clarks Mills, Manitowoc County, Wisconsin, in the town of Cato, Wisconsin in 1883. Sweeting managed several cheese factories and handled butter, cheese, and dairy products. Later, he was a deputy dairy and food inspector and worked at the Aluminum Goods factory. He was also president of the Manitowoc Dairy Board of Trade. Sweeting was active in the Republican Party and served on the Manitowoc County Board of Supervisors. In 1897, Sweeting served in the Wisconsin State Assembly. Sweeting died in a hospital in Manitowoc, Wisconsin.
