= Cato (community), Wisconsin =

Cato, Wisconsin
- Unincorporated community
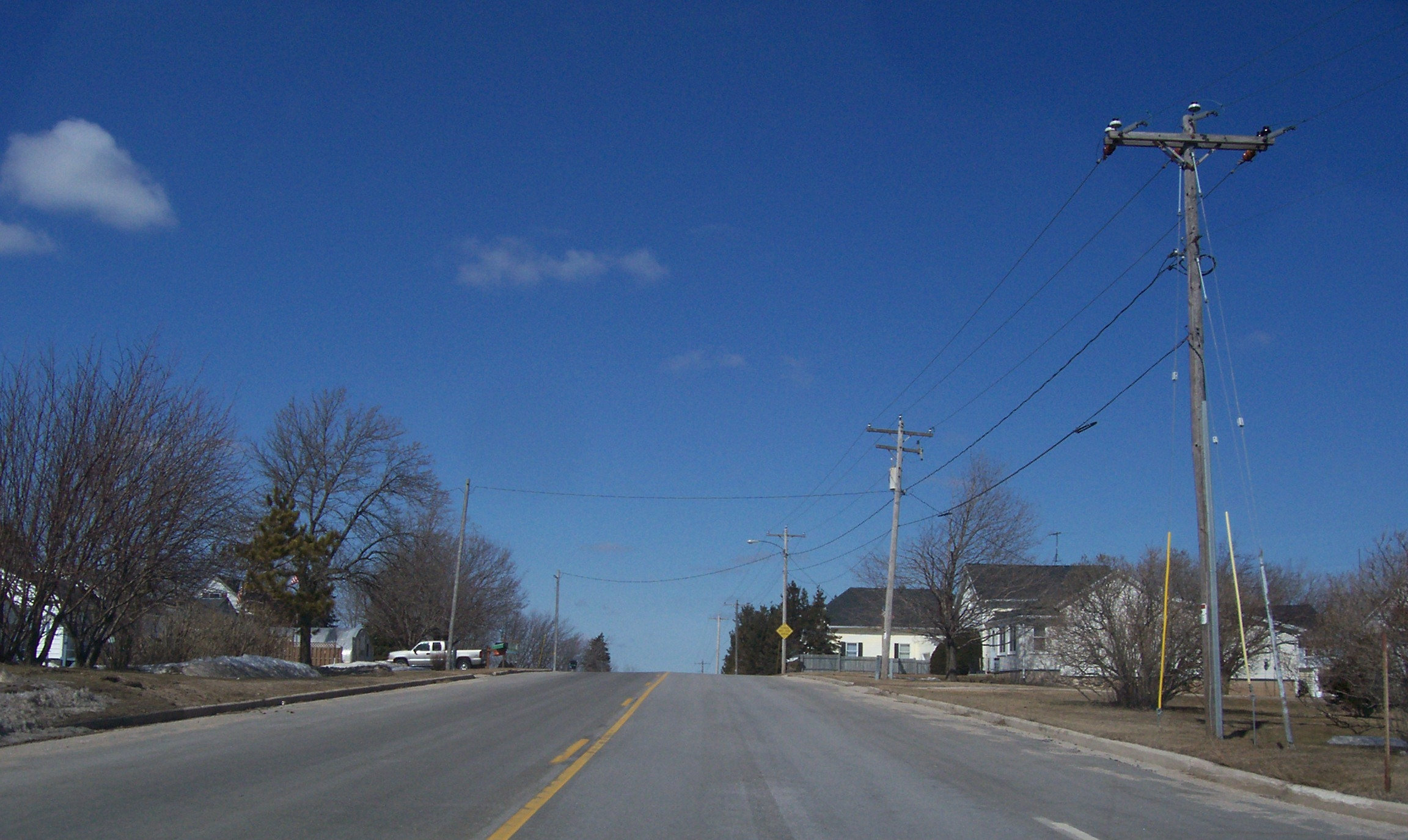
- Downtown Cato

- Location within Wisconsin Location within the United States
- Coordinates: 44°08′34″N 87°51′40″W
- Country: United States
- State: Wisconsin
- County: Manitowoc
- Elevation: 850 ft (260 m)
- Time zone: UTC-6 (Central (CST))
  - Summer (DST): UTC-5 (CDT)
- Area code: 920
- GNIS feature ID: 1562813

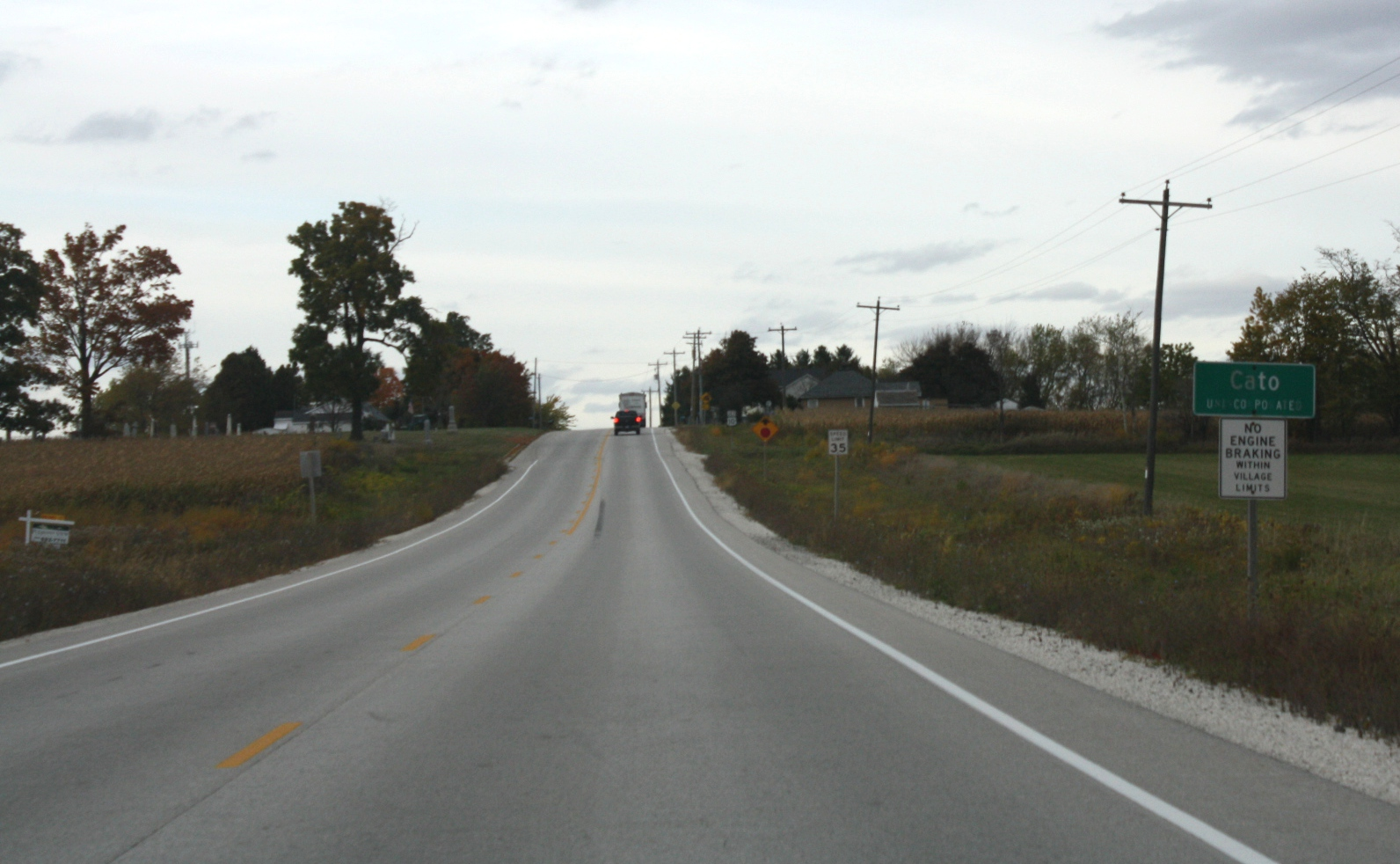
The sign for Cato

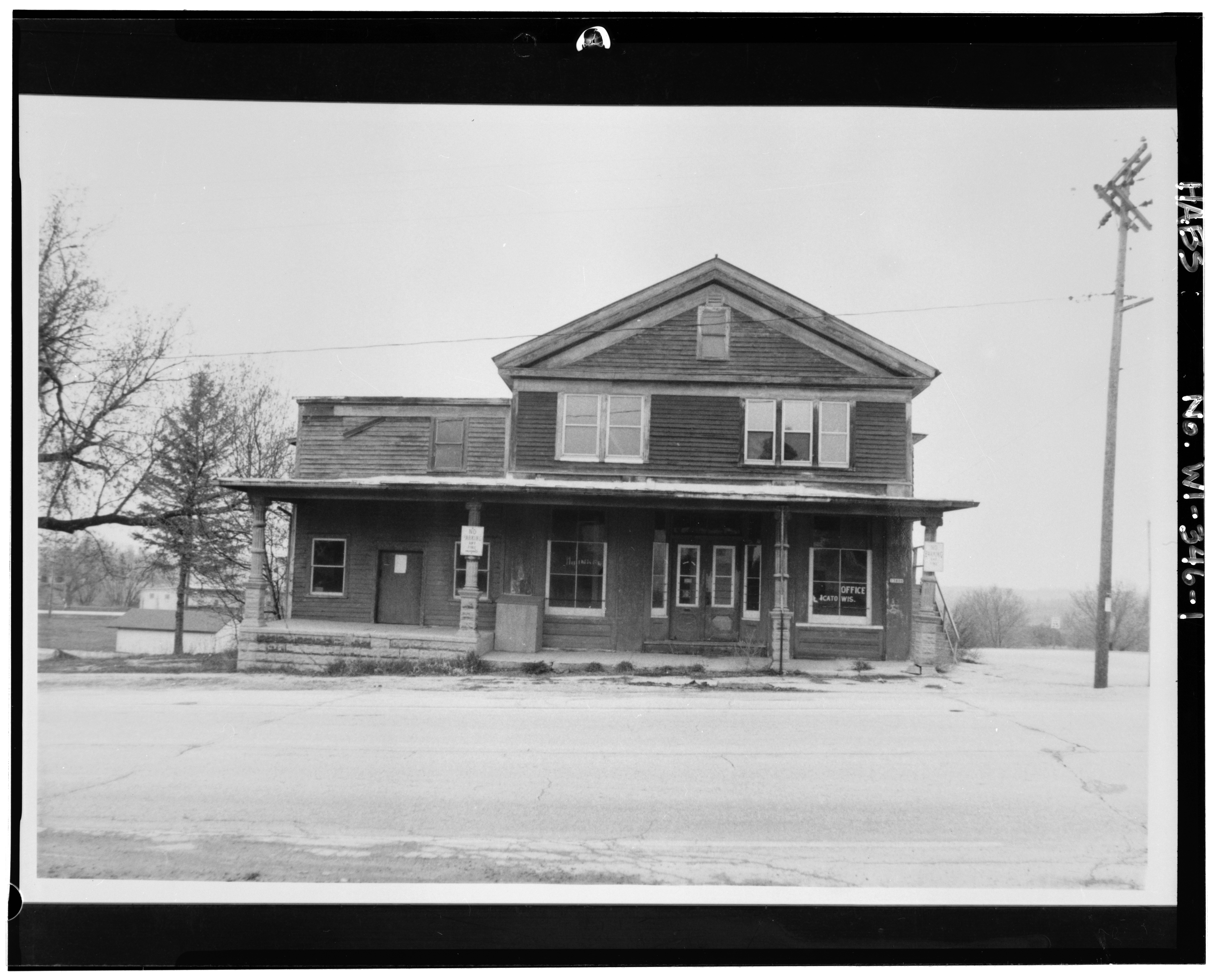
Cato Post Office and General Store

Cato is an unincorporated community located in the town of Cato, Manitowoc County, Wisconsin, United States. Cato is located on U.S. Route 10, 2 miles (3.2 km) west of Whitelaw. U.S. Route 10 also forced the razing of much of downtown Cato.

== History ==
Cato was originally known as Nettle Hills due to the abundant itchy weed before being renamed after a settler's hometown, Cato, New York. As a station along a train line from Manitowoc to Forest Junction, Cato averaged eight trains a day. A school existed from the 1900s to 1930s and a Presbyterian church from then to the 1960s. The post office lasted for 128 years.

In 1992, a project to improve U.S. 10 required the purchase of the townsite and much of the downtown buildings to be razed, thus resulting in historical buildings coming down.
