= The Theory of Business Enterprise =

Book by Thorstein Veblen

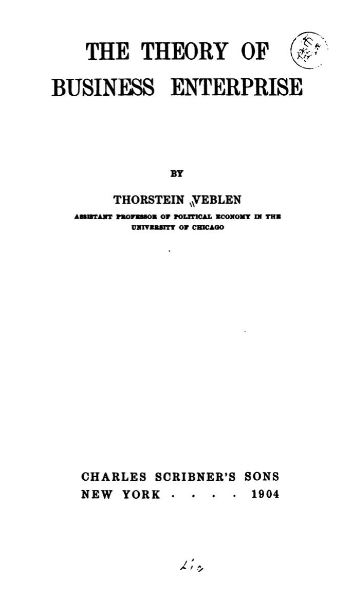
- Title page for The Theory of Business Enterprise (1904)
- Author: Thorstein Veblen
- Language: English
- Genre: Non-fiction
- Publisher: Transaction Books
- Publication date: 1904
- Publication place: United States
- ISBN: 0-87855-699-0

The Theory of Business Enterprise is an economics (or political economy) book by Thorstein Veblen, published in 1904, that looks at the growing corporate domination of culture and the economy.

== Summary ==
At its heart, The Theory of Business Enterprise is an analysis of two intertwined but clashing motivations: that of business and that of industry. Business is the making of profits; industry (or the "machine process") is the making of goods. "The captains of industry" (i.e., capitalists or "robber barons") curtailed production in order to keep prices and profits high. The worst fears of businessmen was a "free run of production" which would essentially collapse all profits.

The book was published at a high point of American concern with business combinations and trusts. Veblen employed his evolutionary analysis to explain these new forms.

Veblen placed the large business concerns in the context of the increasing industrialization of American life. Veblen asserted that, even though there is a commercial need for industry, the machine process has outrun commercial needs and has penetrated every corner of mechanical industries. This process is characterized by the obligation for standardization, certainty and quantitative accuracy and precision.

The growth of industrial processes was certainly conquering the small business firms that had evolved earlier to organize craft production on a disjointed and small scale. Prior to these industrial concerns the only businesses that required significant investments were in shipping across oceans. And the only organizations with a pure business motivation were banking and merchant firms who dealt mainly with loaning, buying and selling.

The need for stability, certainty and uniformity of the industrial era, however, also clashed with modern commercial interests. Where industrial processes are the concerns of engineers and their quest for precision, businessmen are motivated solely by pecuniary gain through purchase and sale. While businessmen certainly represent an older order, in the new order, businessmen are able to leverage the machine process for pecuniary gain even if it means undermining the smooth functioning of the machine process.

It is not true, claims Veblen, that business interests coincide with that of the community. In fact, they may be opposites as business engages significantly in "competitive selling" through advertising, buying, selling and charging what the market will bear. Businessmen pay the wages of those engaged in competitive selling, such as salesmen, buyers, accountants and such, "not because their work is productive of benefit to the community, but because it brings a gain to the employers." This also holds true for the industrial workers engaged in the industrial process under business management. The wages paid to these workmen are "competitively adjusted on grounds of the vendibility of the product", which is determined not by the serviceability of the product but by the aim to make a profitable sale.

Veblen claims that business instincts result in waste and "predation" that serve to enhance the social status of those who could benefit from predatory claims to goods and services.

Work that is, on the whole, useless or detrimental to the community at large may be as gainful to the business man and to the workmen whom he employs as work that contributes substantially to the aggregate livelihood.

Veblen's Theory of Business Enterprise became a critique on the relationship between "business" and industry itself, as far as it dealt with social and technological progress due to the former's reasonable primary motivations revolving around the maximization of profits. According to Veblen, this maximization of profits tended to be executed through the elimination of competition, and competitive behaviors that were outside of the natural market. However, the relationship between “business” and “industry” was uneven as the latter could continue production without the need of the former disrupting the natural flow, in order to maximize profits, leading to a new economic system. However, Veblen himself did at no point openly state support for any one type of economic system such as socialism, though he was in favor of state-owned industry. Veblen claims in his Theory of Business Enterprise that the failures of government allowed the ideas of businessmen to overtake public concern in government welfare.

The government commonly works in the interest of the business men with a fairly consistent singleness of purpose. And in its solicitude for the business men’s interests it is borne out by current public sentiment, for there is a naïve, unquestioning persuasion abroad among the body of the people to the effect that, in some occult way, the material interests of the populace coincide with the pecuniary interests of those business men who live within the scope of the same set of governmental contrivances.

Veblen writes here that the government prioritizes the interests of businessmen with a “fairly consistent singleness of purpose,” and that it is the public, rather than the businessmen themselves, who promote and cause this prioritization. He explains that this is because the populace believes the interests of businessmen parallel their interests. Veblen describes this public credence as “naive” and “occult,” meaning that he believed this view to be comparable to a delusion.

== Significance ==
Veblen's ideas and his work has been considered to maintain itself as being highly influential, and has been cited numerous times in articles, and books in support of economic revolutions as well as changes. These particular works cite both Veblen's theory of the leisure class, as well as business enterprise in order to support their arguments.

Many have categorized Veblen's ideas in The Theory of Business Enterprise as being supportive of Marxist ideals, though Veblen himself was openly distant from comparing or aligning himself with the latter. However both economists are considered to be believers of “technological determinism” believing that it is technological improvements that dictate social roles, as well as behaviors in the modern era. Though their individual takes on the magnitude and effects of it, differ substantially.

== See also ==
- The Theory of the Leisure Class
