= Peter J. Murphy =

American politician

Peter J. Murphy (August 7, 1860 – December 25, 1916) was an American farmer and politician.

Born in the town of Cato in Manitowoc County, Wisconsin, Murphy was a farmer. He served as chairman of the Cato Town Board and on the school board. He served in the Wisconsin State Assembly and was a Democrat. Murphy died of pneumonia at his home in Cato, Wisconsin. He declined to be renominated for re-election to office.
