= Thomas Thornton (politician) =

American politician from Wisconsin (1831–1897)

Thomas Thornton (25 January 1831 – 23 November 1897) was an Irish-born American farmer and politician who served as a member of the Wisconsin State Assembly.

== Biography ==
Thornton was born in County Mayo, Ireland. He settled in Cato, Wisconsin in 1851 and worked as a farmer.

== Political career ==
Thornton was a member of the Assembly during the 1864, 1877 and 1878 sessions. Other positions he held include Treasurer and member of the school board of Cato. He was a member of the Democratic Party of Wisconsin.
