= Guido Marx =

American mechanical engineer and politician

Guido Hugo Marx (29 March 1871 – 10 September 1949) was an American mechanical engineer who was active in progressive politics, the technocracy movement, and civil liberties. He contributed to helping feed and house hundreds of the 1906 San Francisco earthquake survivors and led the Stanford Academic Council through changes in academic freedom, culminating in founding both the American Association of University Professors and the California chapter of the American Civil Liberties Union.

== Biography ==
Guido Hugo Marx was born on 29 March 1871 in Toledo, Ohio. His parents were Joseph Eugene Marx and Johanna Eleanora Marx (ne Pulster); he was their seventh child, in addition to five sisters and an older brother. His father was the editor of a German language newspaper, Die Toledo Express, and his uncle, Guido Marx, was mayor of Toledo in 1875 and 1876. When Marx was one year old his father died of pneumonia leaving his family in difficult financial circumstances, and his mother sent his older brother, Charles David, to wealthy relatives in Germany.

He graduated from the Toledo Manual Training High School at 16 and began work at the Sill Stove Works, where he learned bookkeeping as well as product design, construction, packaging, and repair. In 1889, with financial support from a sister, he attended Cornell University, earning the degree of mechanical engineer in 1893. He worked in industry for two years before joining the Stanford faculty in 1895, at the instigation of Albert W. Smith, his former professor at Cornell who, in collaboration with Guido's brother Charles, was developing Stanford's new School of Engineering. In addition to authoring a book on Machine Design with Albert Smith, his professional activities included research in the fields of gearing and bearing lubrication, advocating vocational guidance for Stanford students, co-founding the American Association of University Professors, and holding office in the American Federation of Teachers. Marx became Professor of Machine Design in 1908.

In the early 1900s, Marx undertook a detailed study of faculty salaries, publishing "What Should College Professors be Paid?" in the Atlantic Monthly in 1905. In 1910 he wrote a series of articles entitled "The Problem of the Assistant Professor". where he highlighted the poor salary of non-tenured staff. This influenced newly appointed trustee Herbert Hoover to examine faculty salary levels at Stanford, ultimately resulting in improvements.

Following the 1906 San Francisco earthquake, he was chair of the food distribution committee of the Palo Alto Earthquake Relief commission and organized a team that served some 300 meals a day in both Palo Alto and at the "Stanford Camp" in San Francisco. During the Depression, he helped organize a local self-help cooperative. Ten years later he wrote that:

"the development of the consumers' cooperative movement was our most hopeful road to adjustment."

In 1911, he and Rufus Lot Green, Professor of Mathematics at Stanford, organized a local branch of the Progressive Party; Marx was the official delegate to its 1912 National Convention. In 1914, at the founding of the American Association of University Professors (AAUP), he again spoke in support of better conditions for non-tenured academics, and in a letter to John Dewey, the founding president of the AAUP, wrote:

"We will get nowhere without a wholesome group consciousness. Our worst troubles as a profession arise from unwarranted assumptions of superiority on the one hand coupled with a too ready acquiescence on the other."

He served on the Planning Commission and the School Board In Palo Alto and played a key role in the construction of Palo Alto's first municipal power plant. In 1919 Thorstein Veblen invited him to teach a course at the New School for Social Research on the social responsibilities of the engineer. Marx wrote:

"It had always been my profound conviction, that the engineer is peculiarly charged with the duty of conserving the natural resources of the world-to utilize them with the greatest immediate and enduring economy and efficiency, for the use and benefit of all of the people."

Subsequently, Leon Ardzrooni invited him to act as a leader of engineers in the New School, replacing Henry Gantt, who had died before being able to take on the leadership. Marx felt that Morris Cooke would be better choice but visited the New School, meeting Howard Scott, whom he found unimpressive. After organizing an unsuccessful meeting with leaders of the American Society of Mechanical Engineers (ASME), Marx became disillusioned with the project and returned to California.

Marx was also active in the American Civil Liberties Union (ACLU), especially around issues of labor organization and the repeal of the Criminal Syndicalism Law, and in 1926 he co-founded and was the first chairman of the California chapter of the ACLU.

Marx retired in 1936, although he returned to Stanford to provide technical training to soldiers during World War II.

== Personal life ==
On June 6, 1895, Marx married Gertrude Van Dusen, a member of the Cornell University library staff and a friend of one of his sisters. Following their marriage they built a house in Palo Alto which was designed with Arthur Bridgman Clark, professor of art and architecture at Stanford. They had four children, 3 daughters (Eleanor, Sylvia and Barbara) and a son (Guido Van Dusen). They later built a cottage in Carmel and a "shack" at Fallen Leaf Lake, where Marx enjoyed rock climbing. Marx died on 10 September 1949 in Palo Alto having outlived his wife and three of his four children.

== See also ==
- The New School for Social Research
- Thorstein Veblen
