= Conspicuous leisure =

Concept

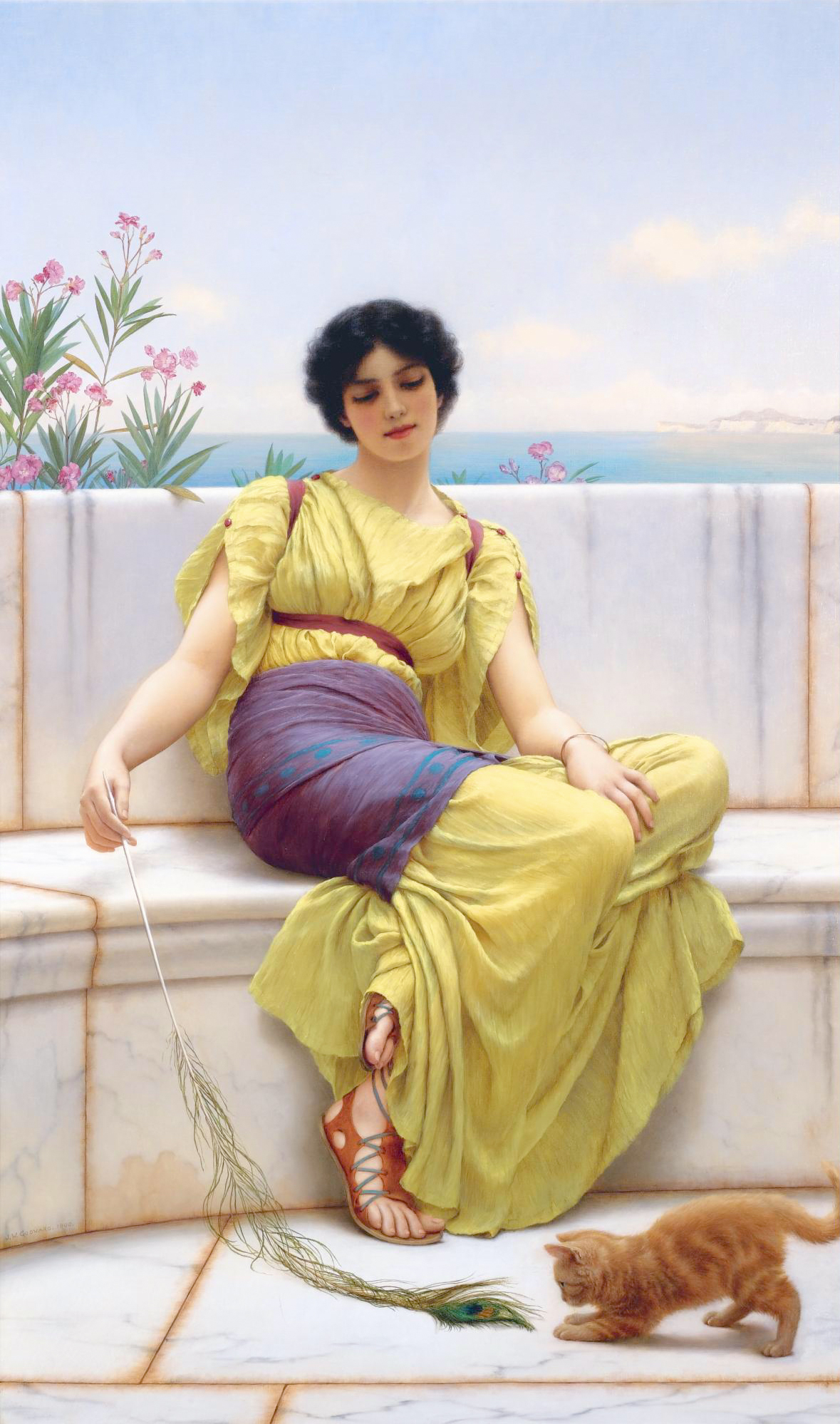
Idleness, by John William Godward, c. 1900

Conspicuous leisure is a concept introduced by the American economist and sociologist Thorstein Veblen in The Theory of the Leisure Class (1899). Conspicuous or visible leisure is engaged in for the sake of displaying and attaining social status.

The concept comprises those forms of leisure that seem to be fully motivated by social factors, such as taking long vacations to exotic places and bringing souvenirs back. Conspicuous leisure is observed in all societies where stratification exists. Conspicuous leisure contributes to the glorification of non-productivity, thus validating the behavior of the most powerful classes and leading the lower classes to admire rather than revile the leisure class. This aids the leisure class in retaining their status and material position. Veblen's more well-known concept of "conspicuous consumption" is employed when non-productivity can be more effectively demonstrated through lavish spending.

Veblen argued that conspicuous leisure had deep historical roots reaching back into prehistory, and that it "evolved" into different forms as time passed. One example he gave was how, during the Middle Ages, the nobility was exempted from manual labor, which was reserved for serfs. Like owning land, abstaining from labor is a typical display of wealth and one that becomes more problematic as society develops into an industrial one. With the emergence of individual ownership, the leisure class completely stops contributing to the wellbeing of their community. They no longer perform honor-positions, thus totally negating their usefulness to the society. And as society moves away from hunting and agriculture, and towards industrialization, the leisure class can no longer simply take resources from others. This is where Veblen offers us an image of the decaying Lord or Lady who has lost their fortune but is unable to engage in labor in order to live. These wealthy elite see labor as menial and vulgar, yet once they can no longer live their worthy life of leisure they suffer from an inability to preserve themselves.

Veblen defines leisure as the non-productive consumption of time. The wealthy consume time unproductively due to a disgust of menial labor but also as evidence of their pecuniary ability to live idle lives. But there are moments when even the noble is not viewed publicly and then he must give a satisfactory account of his use of time. Often his account will manifest through the appearance of servants or some sort of craftsmen. A material proof of leisure is another way that the noble demonstrates his wealth even when he is out of the public's eye. Objects or trophies or knowledge that has no real-world application are all examples of the things that the wealthy use to demonstrate their wealth and their leisure. Also, wearing high fashion garments is an example of display of consumption. Displaying rules of etiquette and breeding, and formal and ceremonial observances are other demonstrations of unproductive (and therefore leisurely) uses of time.

It is also not enough for the leisure class to live a life of idleness; their servants must also engage in the performance of leisure despite their position as hired help. They are given uniforms, spacious quarters and other material items that signal the wealth of their employer: the more lavish the servants' dress and quarters, the more money the master has to spend freely. This is an example of "conspicuous consumption", a form of conspicuous leisure. House servants give the illusion of "pecuniary decency" to the household, despite the physical discomfort that the leisure class feels at the sight of servants, who produce labor.

== See also ==
- Affluenza
- Celebrity culture
- Internet celebrity
