= Cato, Wisconsin =

- Town
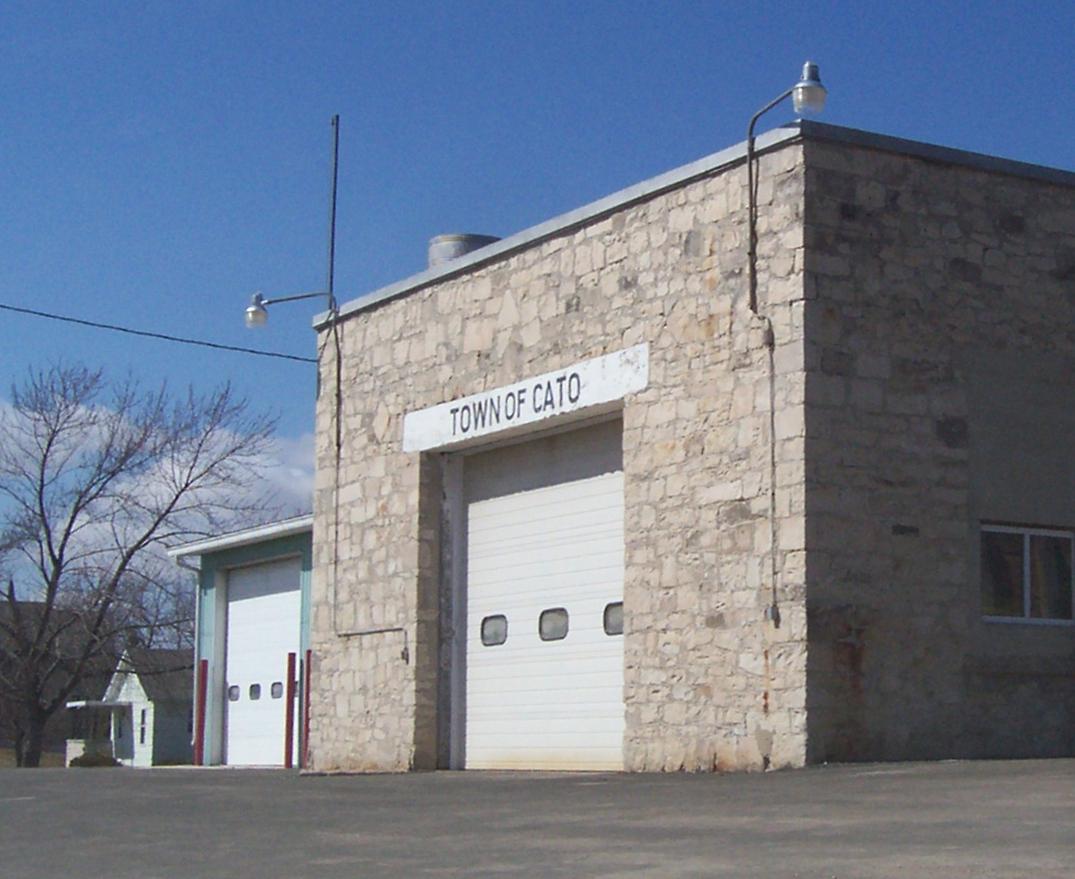
- Town Hall in Clarks Mills

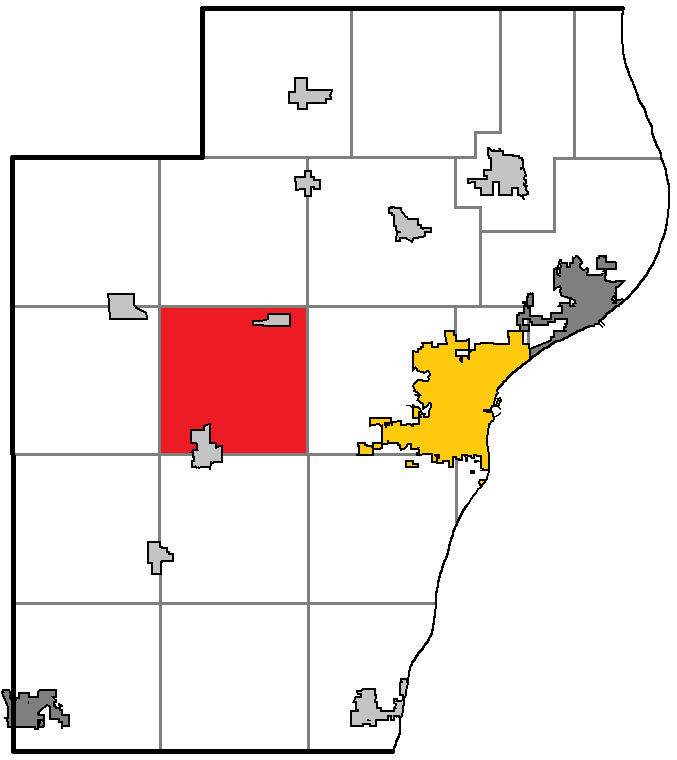
- Location of Cato, within Manitowoc County
- Coordinates: 44°6′12″N 87°51′28″W
- Country: United States
- State: Wisconsin
- County: Manitowoc

Area
  - Total: 35.4 sq mi (91.6 km^{2})
  - Land: 35.1 sq mi (91.0 km^{2})
  - Water: 0.23 sq mi (0.6 km^{2})
- Elevation: 833 ft (254 m)

Population (2020)
  - Total: 1,621
  - Density: 46.1/sq mi (17.8/km^{2})
- Time zone: UTC-6 (Central (CST))
  - Summer (DST): UTC-5 (CDT)
- Area code: 920
- FIPS code: 55-13237
- GNIS feature ID: 1582933
- Website: www.townofcato.com

Cato is a town in Manitowoc County, Wisconsin, United States. The population was 1,621 at the 2020 census. A Manitowoc County park is located in the town; it is called "Cato Falls" after a waterfall on the Manitowoc River.

== Communities ==
- Cato is an unincorporated community located at the intersection of US 10 and County Road J (the county road south of US 10 was WIS 148).
- Cato Falls is an unincorporated community located north of the Manitowoc River at the intersection of Clark Mills Road and Leist Road.
- Clark Mills is a census-designated place located mostly north of the County Road J/JJ intersection on County Road J.
- Grimms is an unincorporated community at the intersection of US 10 and County Road G. North Grimms is located a short distance away on County Road G.
- Madsen is an unincorporated community located on County Road S north of the route's intersection at US 151.

== History ==
A post office called Cato was established in 1870, and remained in operation until it was discontinued in 1998. The town was named after Cato, New York, the former hometown of an early settler.

== Geography ==
According to the United States Census Bureau, the town has a total area of 35.3 square miles (91.6 km^{2}), of which 35.1 square miles (91.0 km^{2}) is land and 0.2 square miles (0.6 km^{2}) (0.62%) is water.

== Demographics ==
As of the census of 2000, there were 1,616 people, 548 households, and 458 families residing in the town. The population density was 46.0 people per square mile (17.8/km^{2}). There were 571 housing units at an average density of 16.3 per square mile (6.3/km^{2}). The racial makeup of the town was 97.59% White, 0.50% Native American, 0.68% Asian, 0.62% from other races, and 0.62% from two or more races. Hispanic or Latino people of any race were 1.67% of the population.

There were 548 households, out of which 36.1% had children under the age of 18 living with them, 73.4% were married couples living together, 5.7% had a female householder with no husband present, and 16.4% were non-families. 13.7% of all households were made up of individuals, and 5.7% had someone living alone who was 65 years of age or older. The average household size was 2.95 and the average family size was 3.24.

In the town, the population was spread out, with 28.1% under the age of 18, 8.5% from 18 to 24, 30.6% from 25 to 44, 22.6% from 45 to 64, and 10.2% who were 65 years of age or older. The median age was 36 years. For every 100 females, there were 106.1 males. For every 100 females age 18 and over, there were 108.6 males.

The median income for a household in the town was $53,462, and the median income for a family was $59,145. Males had a median income of $36,384 versus $23,750 for females. The per capita income for the town was $21,434. About 3.3% of families and 4.9% of the population were below the poverty line, including 5.7% of those under age 18 and 6.8% of those age 65 or over.

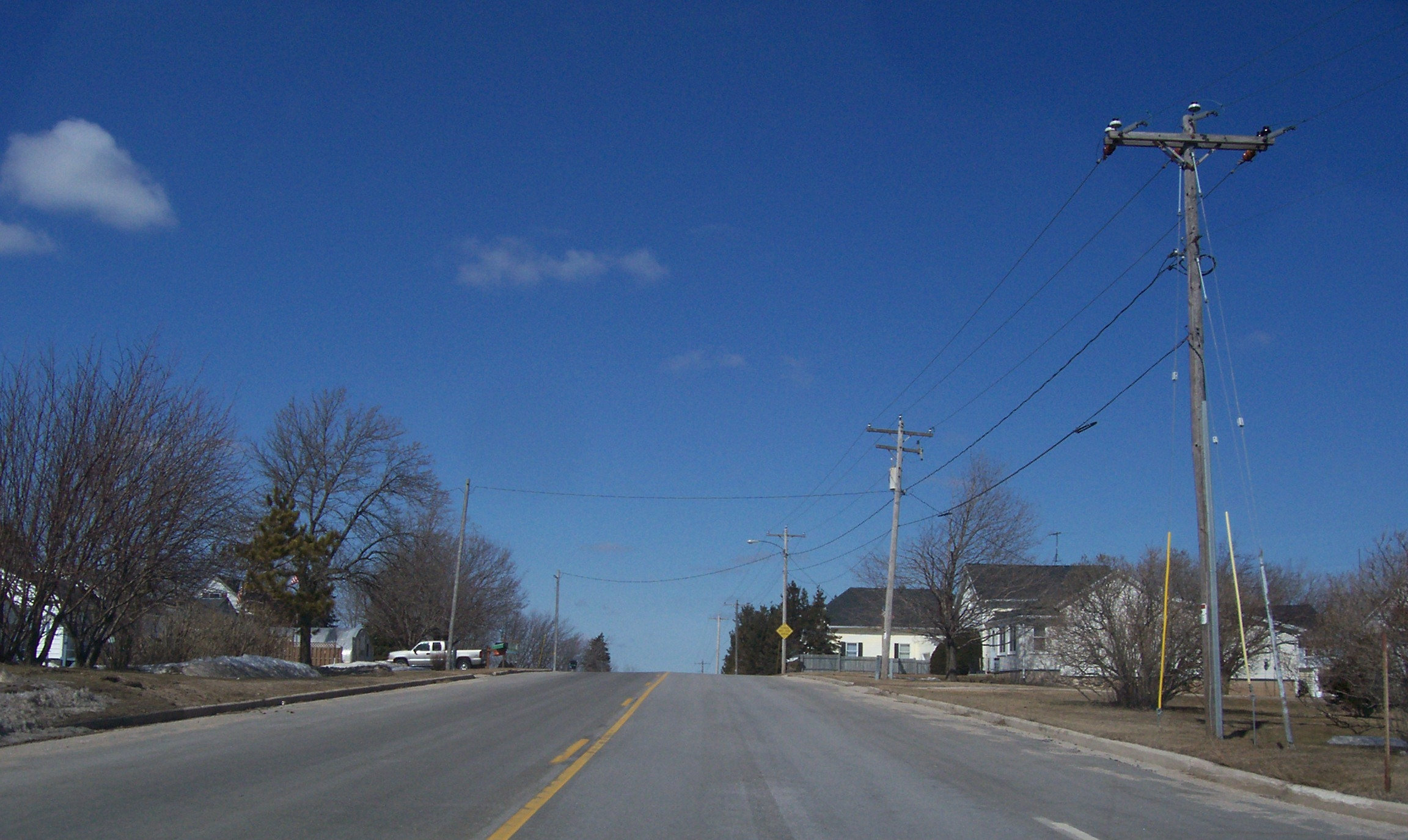
The unincorporated community of Cato

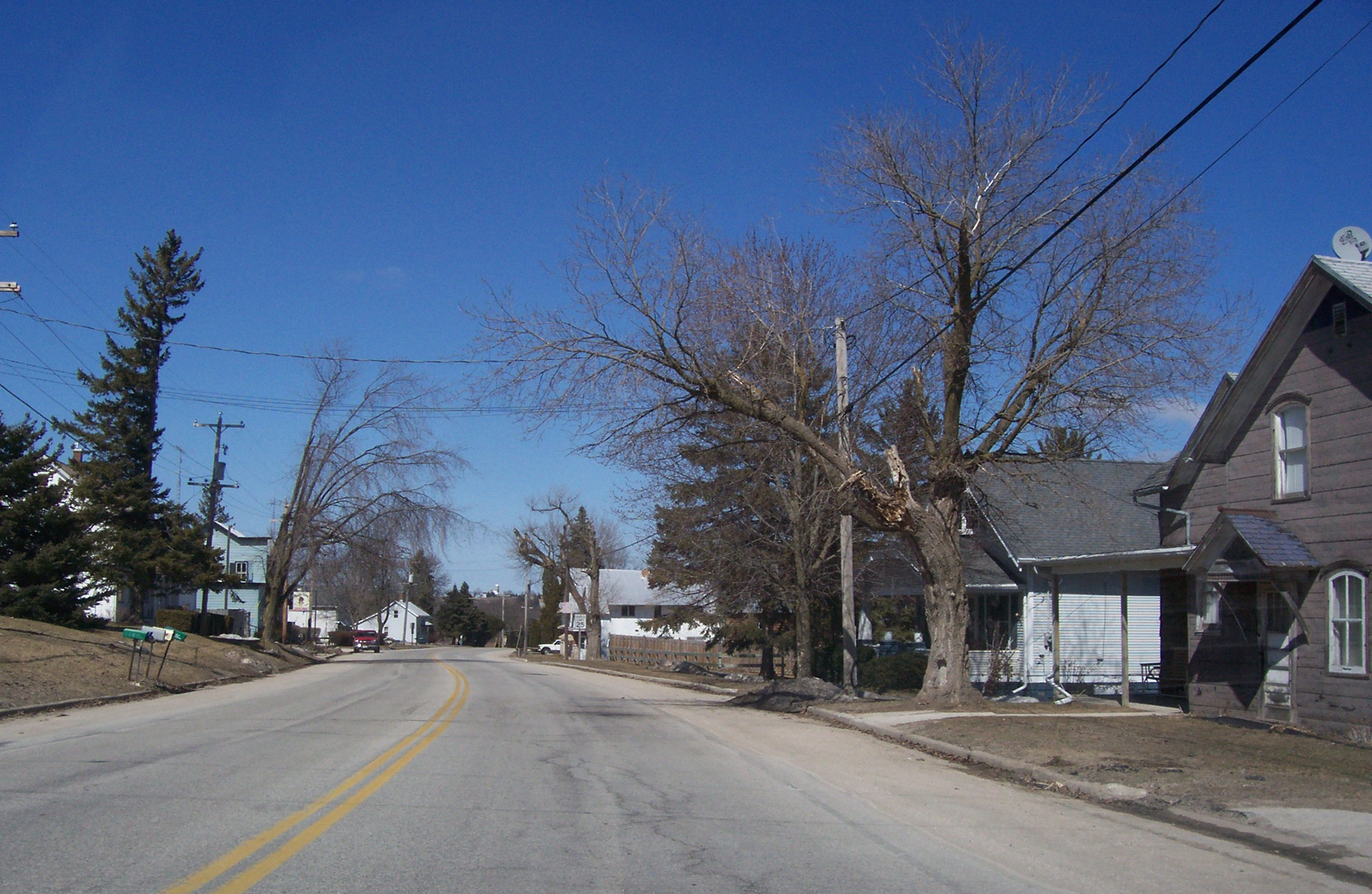
Clarks Mills

== Infrastructure and transport ==
Cato is bisected north to south by U.S. Route 10, the main road passing through the town. The Manitowoc River runs its course about two and one-half miles south of Cato. The nearest Interstate highway is Interstate 43, where an exit near Manitowoc Rapids links with US 10. Though Manitowoc County Airport is the nearest airport, it has no regularly scheduled commercial service, and airports serving Green Bay and Appleton such as Green Bay–Austin Straubel International Airport and Appleton International Airport provide the closest commercial service to Cato.

== Notable people ==
- Maurice B. Brennan, Wisconsin State Representative and farmer, lived in the town
- Peter J. Murphy, Wisconsin State Representative and farmer, born in the town
- Thomas Thornton, Wisconsin State Representative and farmer, lived here and was treasurer and a member of the town school board
- Thorstein Veblen, a late 19th-century economist, born in the town
