= Clarks Mills, Wisconsin =

- Unincorporated community
- Location within Wisconsin Location within the United States
- Coordinates: 44°05′24″N 87°51′51″W
- Country: United States
- State: Wisconsin
- County: Manitowoc
- Elevation: 850 ft (260 m)
- Time zone: UTC-6 (Central (CST))
  - Summer (DST): UTC-5 (CDT)
- Area code: 920
- GNIS feature ID: 1563123

Clarks Mills is an unincorporated community located in the town of Cato, Manitowoc County, Wisconsin, United States. Clarks Mills is on the Manitowoc River northeast of Valders. It is named for early settler Ira Clark, who along with Thomas Cunningham built a mill and bridge there in the 1840s.

The community is home to St. Mary's Catholic Church and St. Mary-St. Michael Catholic School.

== Notable people ==
- Charles W. Sweeting, Wisconsin State Representative and businessman; lived in Clarks Mills; managed several cheese factories

== Images ==
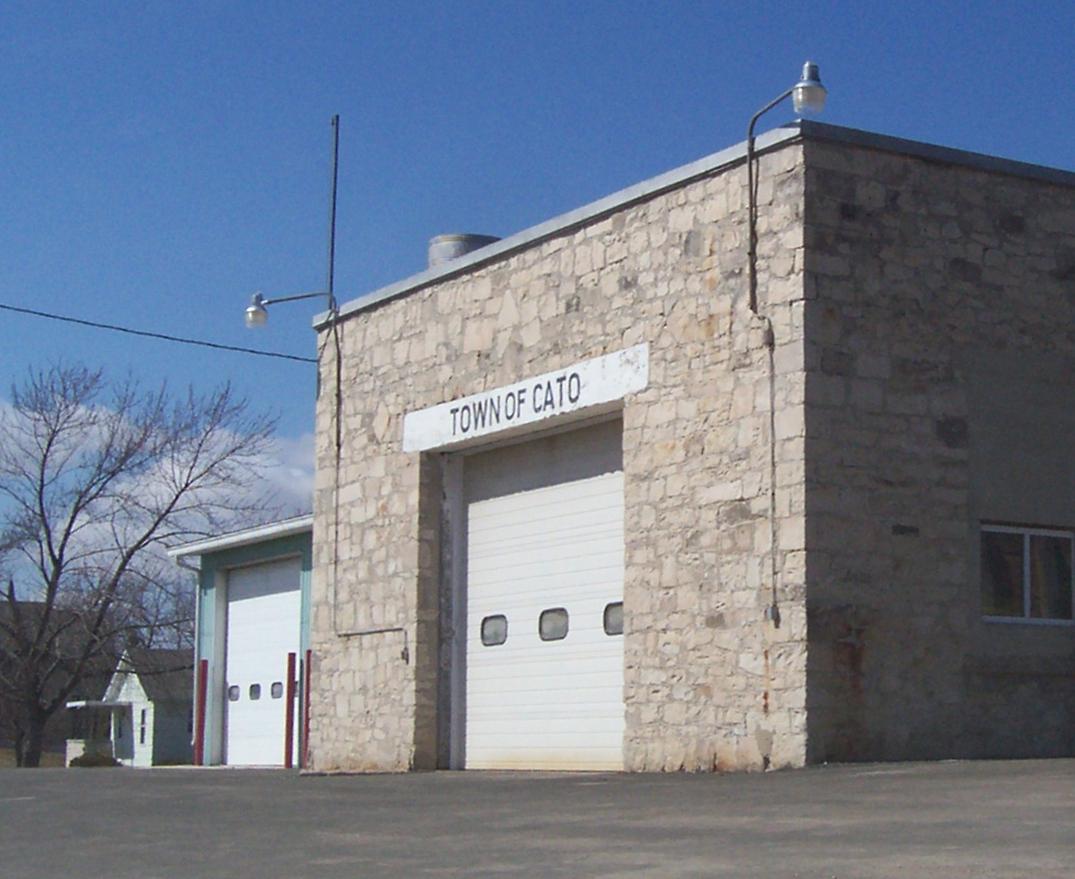
Town of Cato town hall in Clarks Mills

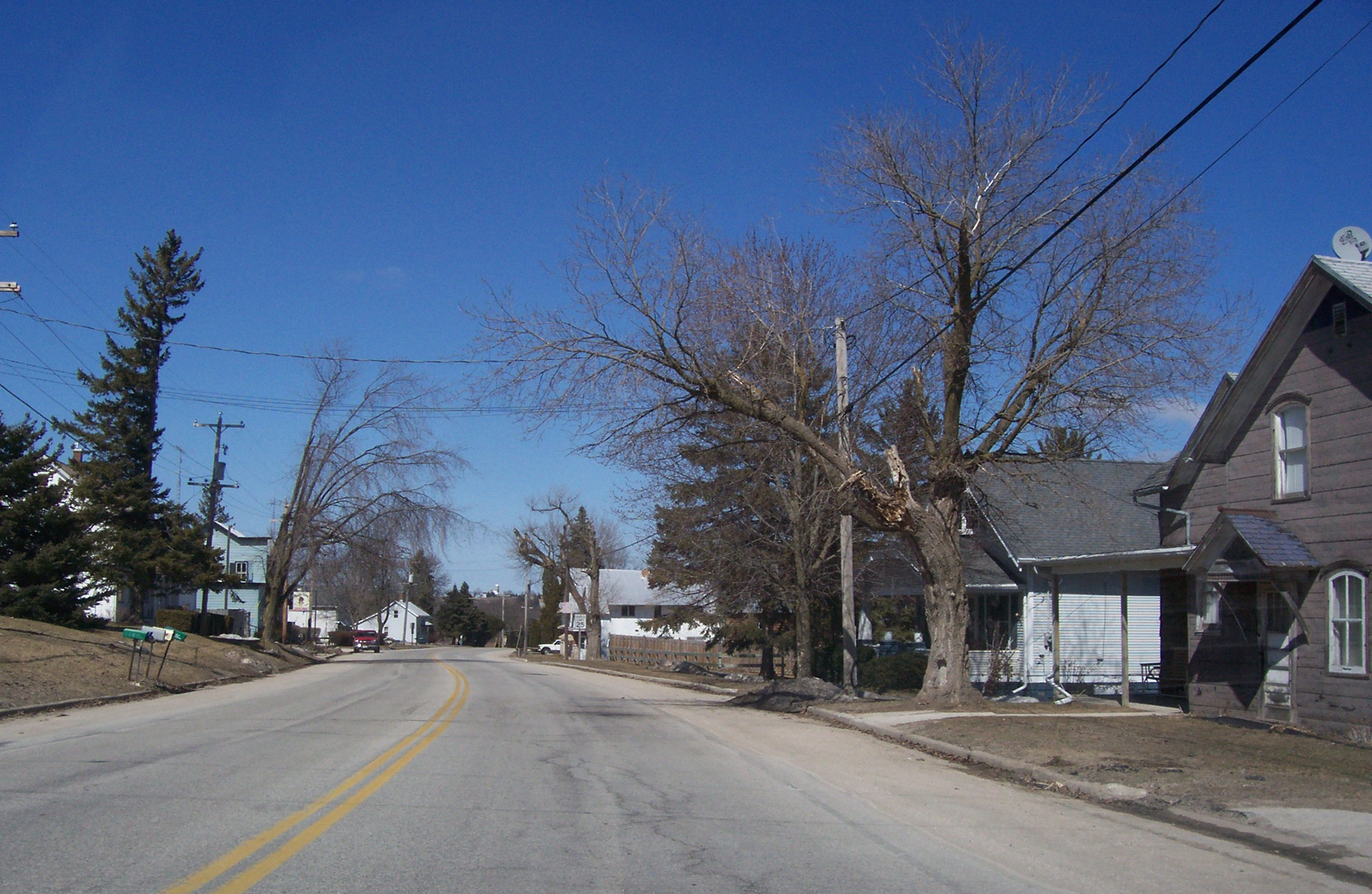
Looking north at Clarks Mills

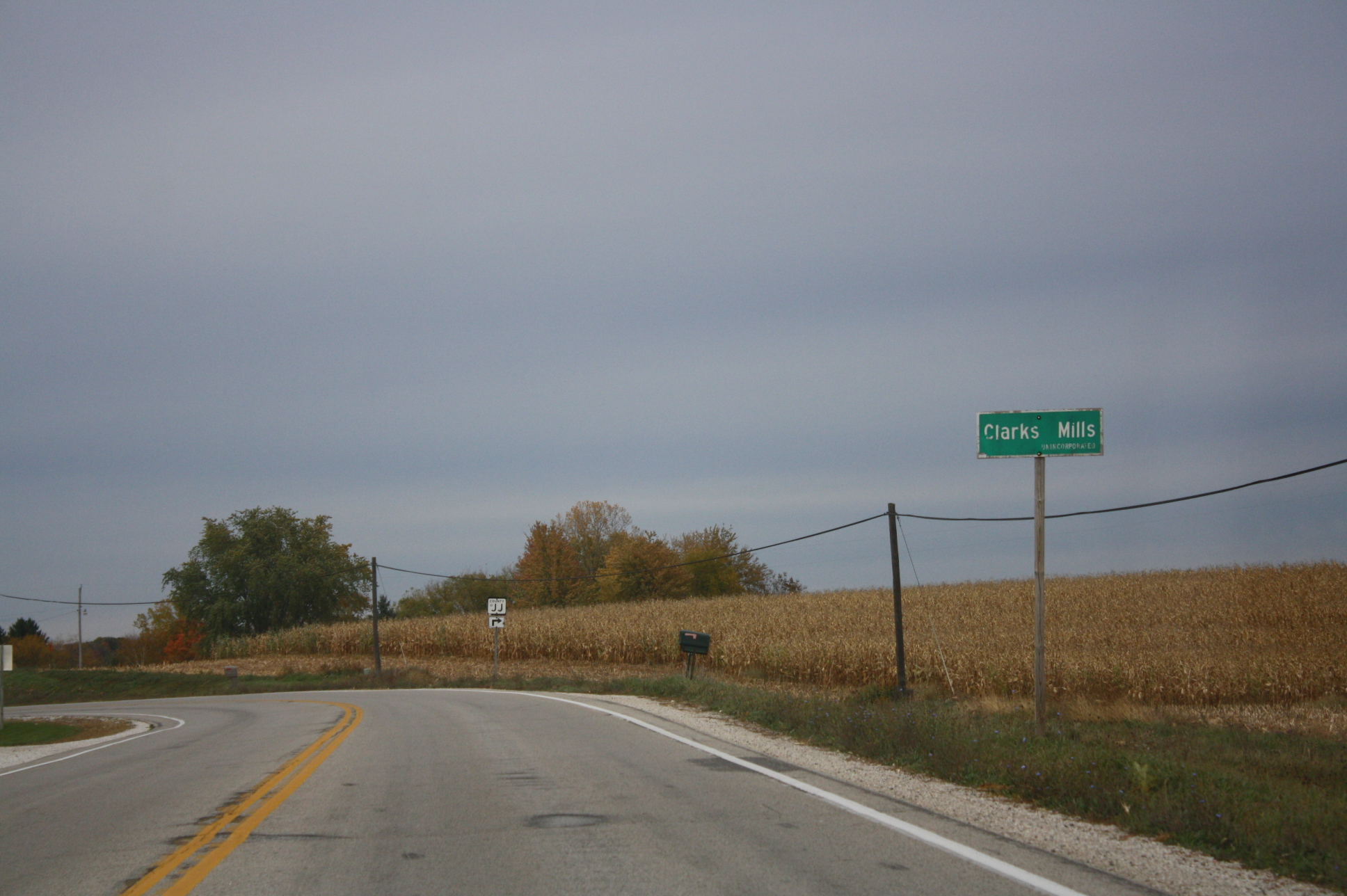
The sign for Clarks Mills
