= Robert Sweeting (politician) =

Bahamian politician

Robert Percival Sweeting OBE is a Bahamian politician, and was an MP (Member of Parliament) in the Bahamas Parliament, representing the South Abaco Constituency, from 2002 until 2007. He did not run in the May 2007 general election.

He was named an Officer of the Order of the British Empire "for service to the community" in the 2002 New Year Honours lists.
