= Technocracy movement =

1930s North American social movement

The official symbol of the technocracy movement (Technocracy Inc.). The monad emblem signifies balance between consumption and production.

The technocracy movement was a social movement active in the United States and Canada in the 1930s which favored technocracy as a system of government over representative democracy and partisan politics. Historians associate the movement with engineer Howard Scott's Technical Alliance and Technocracy Incorporated prior to the internal factionalism that dissolved the latter organization during the Second World War. Technocracy was ultimately overshadowed by other proposals for dealing with the crisis of the Great Depression. The technocracy movement proposed replacing partisan politicians and business people with scientists and engineers who had the technical expertise to manage the economy. The movement did not fully aspire to scientocracy.

The movement was committed to abstaining from all partisan politics and communist revolution. It gained strength in the 1930s. In 1940, due to opposition to the Second World War, it was banned in Canada. The ban was lifted in 1943 when it was apparent that "Technocracy Inc. was committed to the war effort, proposing a program of total conscription." The movement continued to expand during the remainder of the war, and new sections were formed in Ontario and the Maritime Provinces.

The technocracy movement survived into the 21st century and, as of 2013, was continuing to publish a newsletter, maintain a website, and hold member meetings. The Technocracy, Inc. web site later had a post on it stating that the site was under renovation, under new ownership, announcing a "Transition Plan 2016", and an online meeting in April 2021. Smaller groups included the Technical Alliance, the New Machine, and the Utopian Society of America.

== Overview ==
Technocracy advocates contended that price system-based forms of government and economy are structurally incapable of effective action, and promoted a society headed by technical experts, which they argued would be more rational and productive.

The coming of the Great Depression ushered in radically different ideas of social engineering, culminating in reforms introduced by the New Deal. By late 1932, various groups across the United States were calling themselves technocrats and proposing reforms.

By the mid-1930s, interest in the technocracy movement was declining. Some historians have attributed the decline of the technocracy movement to the rise of Roosevelt's New Deal. Historian William E. Akin rejects that thesis arguing instead that the movement declined in the mid-1930s as a result of the failure of its proponents to devise a 'viable political theory for achieving change' (p. 111 Technocracy and the American Dream: The Technocrat Movement, 1900–1941 by William E. Akin), although many technocrats in the United States were sympathetic to the electoral efforts of anti-New Deal third parties.

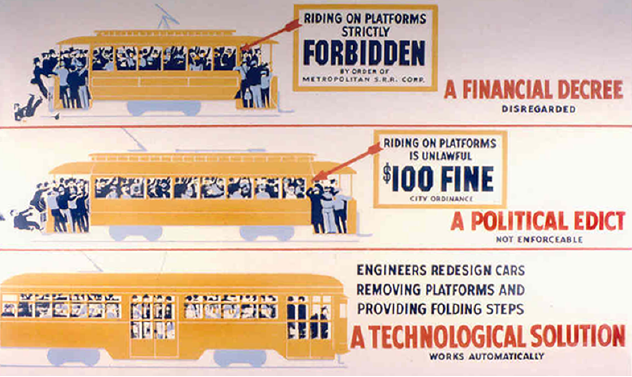
Technocracy three streetcars design talking point

One of the most widely circulated images in Technocracy Inc.'s promotional materials used the example of a streetcar to argue that engineering solutions will always succeed where legislation or fines fail to adequately deal with social problems. If passengers insist on riding on the car's dangerous outer platform, the solution consists in designing cars without platforms.

== Origins ==
The technocratic movement has its origins with the progressive engineers of the early twentieth century and the writings of Edward Bellamy, along with some of the later works of Thorstein Veblen such as The Engineers And The Price System written in 1921. William H. Smyth, a California engineer, invented the word technocracy in 1919 to describe "the rule of the people made effective through the agency of their servants, the scientists and engineers", and in the 1920s it was used to describe the works of Thorstein Veblen.

Early technocratic organizations formed after the First World War. These included Henry Gantt’s "The New Machine" and Veblen's "Soviet of Technicians". These organizations folded after a short time. Writers such as Henry Gantt, Thorstein Veblen, and Howard Scott suggested that businesspeople were incapable of reforming their industries in the public interest and that control of industry should thus be given to engineers.

== Europe ==
In Germany before the Second World War, a technocratic movement based on the American model introduced by Technocracy Incorporated existed, but ran afoul of the political system there.

There was a Soviet movement, the early history of which resembled the North American one during the interwar period. One of its leading members was engineer Peter Palchinsky. Technocratic ideology was also promoted in the Engineer's Herald journal. The Soviet technocrats advanced the scientization of the economic development, management as well as industrial and organizational psychology under the slogan, "the future belongs to the managing-engineers and the engineering-managers".

Those viewpoints were supported by leading Right Opposition members Nikolai Bukharin and Alexei Rykov. The promotion of an alternative view on the country's industrialization and the engineer's role in society incurred Joseph Stalin's wrath. Palchinsky was executed in 1929, and a year later leading Soviet engineers were accused of an anti-government conspiracy in the Industrial Party Trial. A large scale persecution of engineers followed, forcing them to focus on narrow technical issues assigned to them by communist party leaders.

The concept of Tektology developed by Alexander Bogdanov, perhaps the most important of the non-Leninist Bolsheviks, bears some semblance to technocratic ideas. Both Bogdanov's fiction and his political writings, as presented by Zenovia Sochor, imply that he expected a coming revolution against capitalism to lead to a technocratic society.

== United States and Canada ==
Technocracy Incorporated
- Abbreviation: Tech Inc.
- Leader: Justin Lazzara
- Founder: Howard Scott; Marion King Hubbert
- Founded: January 1933; 93 years ago
- Split from: Committee on Technocracy
- Headquarters: Huntington Beach, California
- Membership: ▲ c. 15 (Note: Technocracy Inc. is a non-profit membership organization with monthly dues of $12 USD, or $120 USD annually)
- Ideology: Technocracy; Industrial democracy; Gender equality; Anti-fascism; Anti-capitalism; Pan-Americanism
- Political position: Far-left to non-political
- Continental affiliation: North-America
- Colors: Red Gray
- Slogan: Investigate Technocracy

Party flag
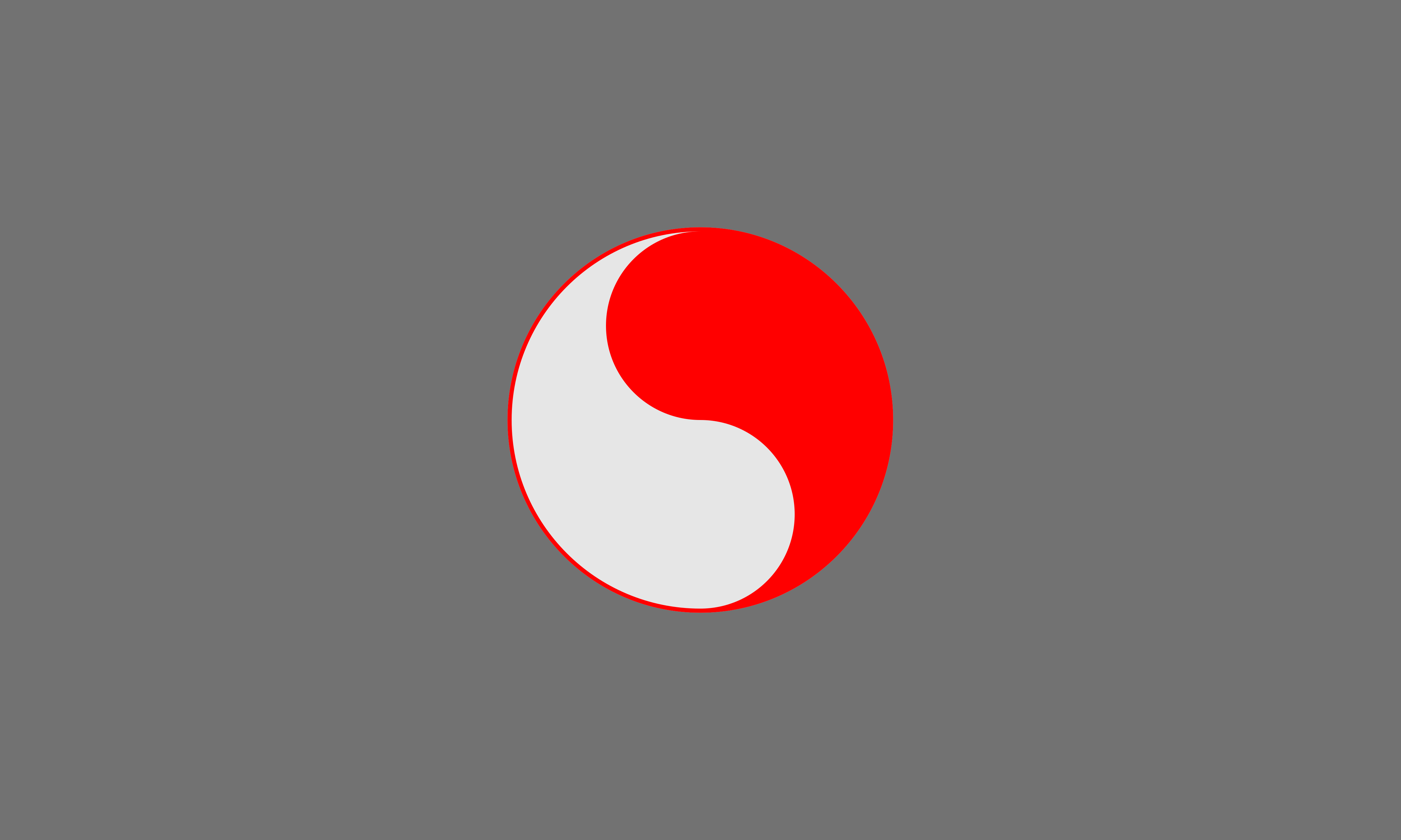

Website
- technocracyinc.org

Howard Scott has been called the "founder of the technocracy movement". Near the end of 1919, he started the Technical Alliance in New York. Members of the alliance were mostly scientists and engineers. The Technical Alliance started an "energy survey of North America", which aimed to provide a scientific background from which ideas about a new social structure could be developed. In 1921, the group broke up before the survey was completed.

In 1932, Scott and others interested in the problems of technological growth and economic change began meeting in New York City. Their ideas gained national attention and the "Committee on Technocracy" was formed at Columbia University, by Howard Scott and Walter Rautenstrauch. The group was short-lived and in January 1933 splintered into two other groups, the "Continental Committee on Technocracy" (led by Harold Loeb) and "Technocracy Incorporated" (led by Scott).

Smaller groups included the Technical Alliance, American Technocratic League, The New Machine and the Utopian Society of America, though Bellamy had the most success due to his nationalistic stances, and Veblen's rhetoric, removing the current pricing system and his blueprint for a national directorate to reorganize all produced goods and supply, and ultimately to radically increase all industrial output.

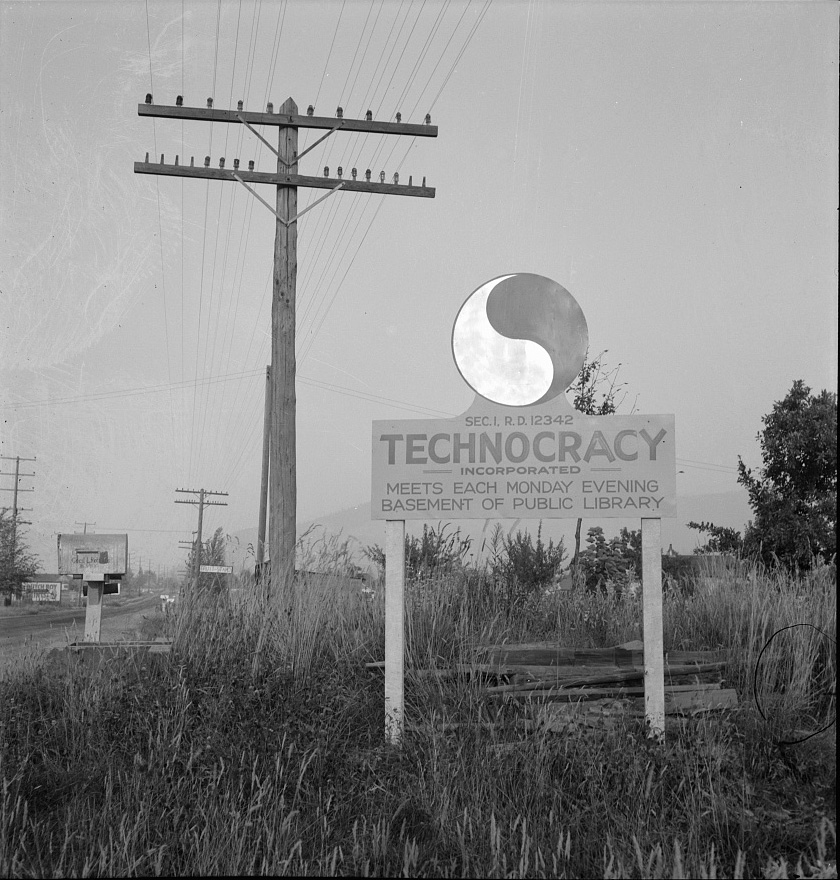
A sign on the outskirts of a Depression-era town about meetings of the local technocracy branch

At the core of Scott's vision was "an energy theory of value". Since the basic measure common to the production of all goods and services was energy, he reasoned "that the sole scientific foundation for the monetary system was also energy", and that society could be designed more efficiently by using an energy metric instead of a monetary metric (energy certificates or 'energy accounting'). Technocracy Inc. officials wore a uniform consisting of a "well-tailored double-breasted suit, gray shirt, and blue necktie, with a monad insignia on the lapel", and its members saluted Scott in public.

Public interest in technocracy peaked in the early 1930s:

In 1932–33 the ideas of the technocrats overshadowed all other proposals for dealing with the crisis. No economic study had ever received such widespread attention. Newspapers spread technocracy across the front pages; periodicals devoted more features to it than to Franklin D. Roosevelt; spontaneous organizations and study groups sprung up across the United States and spread across the border into Canada. For a moment in time it was possible for thoughtful people to believe that America would consciously choose to become a technocracy.

Technocracy seemed a genuine alternative in the early thirties. There were numerous ideologies and prescriptions for dissatisfied Americans to choose from in 1932-33. Still, for a brief time the excitement and immediate appeal of technocracy overshadowed socialism, communism, fascism, the numerous economic planning schemes, and the preinauguration New Deal.

Technocracy's heyday lasted only from June 16, 1932, when the New York Times became the first influential press organ to report its activities, until January 13, 1933, when Scott, attempting to silence his critics, delivered what some critics called a confusing, and uninspiring address on a well-publicized nationwide radio hookup.

Following Scott's radio address from the Hotel Pierre, the condemnation of both him and technocracy in general reached a peak. The press and business people reacted with ridicule and almost unanimous hostility. The American Engineering Council charged the technocrats with "unprofessional activity, questionable data, and drawing unwarranted conclusions".

The technocrats made a believable case for a kind of technological utopia, but their asking price was too high. The idea of political democracy still represented a stronger ideal than technological elitism. In the end, critics believed that the socially desirable goals that technology made possible could be achieved without the sacrifice of existing institutions and values and without incurring the apocalypse that technocracy predicted.

The faction-ridden Continental Committee on Technocracy collapsed in October 1936. However, Technocracy Incorporated continued.

On October 7, 1940, the Royal Canadian Mounted Police arrested members of Technocracy Incorporated, charging them with belonging to an illegal organization. One of the arrested was Joshua Norman Haldeman, a Regina chiropractor, former leader of the Regina branch of Technocracy Incorporated in Saskatchewan, and the maternal grandfather of Elon Musk. Another notable former Technocracy Inc. member is Jacque Fresco, who later went on to form Sociocyberneering Inc., and then The Venus Project, advocating for a 'resource based economy'. Other members who contributed greatly to the movement by writing numerous texts and books are the arachnologist Ivie Wilton and Stella K. Block, to whom technocracy inc dedicated a text to the latter, entitled "In Fond Memory: Stella K. Block 1910—1996".

There were some speaking tours of the US and Canada in 1946 and 1947, and a motorcade from Los Angeles to Vancouver:

Hundreds of cars, trucks, and trailers, all regulation grey, from all over the Pacific Northwest, participated. An old school bus, repainted and retrofitted with sleeping and office facilities, a two-way radio, and a public address system, impressed observers. A huge war surplus searchlight mounted on a truck bed was included, and grey-painted motorcycles acted as parade marshals. A small grey aircraft, with a Monad symbol on its wings, flew overhead. All this was recorded by the Technocrats on 16-mm 900-foot colour film.

In 1948, activity declined while dissent increased within the movement. One central factor contributing to dissent was that "the price system had not collapsed, and predictions about the expected demise were becoming more and more vague". Some quite specific predictions about the price system collapse were made during the Great Depression, the first giving 1937 as the date, and the second forecasting the collapse as occurring "prior to 1940".

Membership and activity declined steadily after 1948, but some activity persisted, mostly around Vancouver, Canada and on the West Coast of the United States. Technocracy Incorporated currently maintains a website and distributes a monthly newsletter and holds membership meetings.

An extensive archive of Technocracy's materials is held at the University of Alberta.

== Technocrats' plan ==
In a publication from 1938 Technocracy Inc., the main organization made the following statement in defining their proposal:

Technocracy is the science of social engineering, the scientific operation of the entire social mechanism to produce and distribute goods and services to the entire population of this continent. For the first time in human history it will be done as a scientific, technical, engineering problem. There will be no place for Politics or Politicians, Finance or Financiers, Rackets or Racketeers.

Technocracy states that this method of operating the social mechanism of the North American Continent is now mandatory because we have passed from a state of actual scarcity into the present status of potential abundance in which we are now held to an artificial scarcity forced upon us in order to continue a Price System which can distribute goods only by means of a medium of exchange. Technocracy states that price and abundance are incompatible; the greater the abundance the smaller the price. In a real abundance there can be no price at all. Only by abandoning the interfering price control and substituting a scientific method of production and distribution can an abundance be achieved. Technocracy will distribute by means of a certificate of distribution available to every citizen from birth to death.

The Technate will encompass the entire American Continent from Panama to the North Pole because the natural resources and the natural boundary of this area make it an independent, self-sustaining geographical unit.

=== Calendar ===
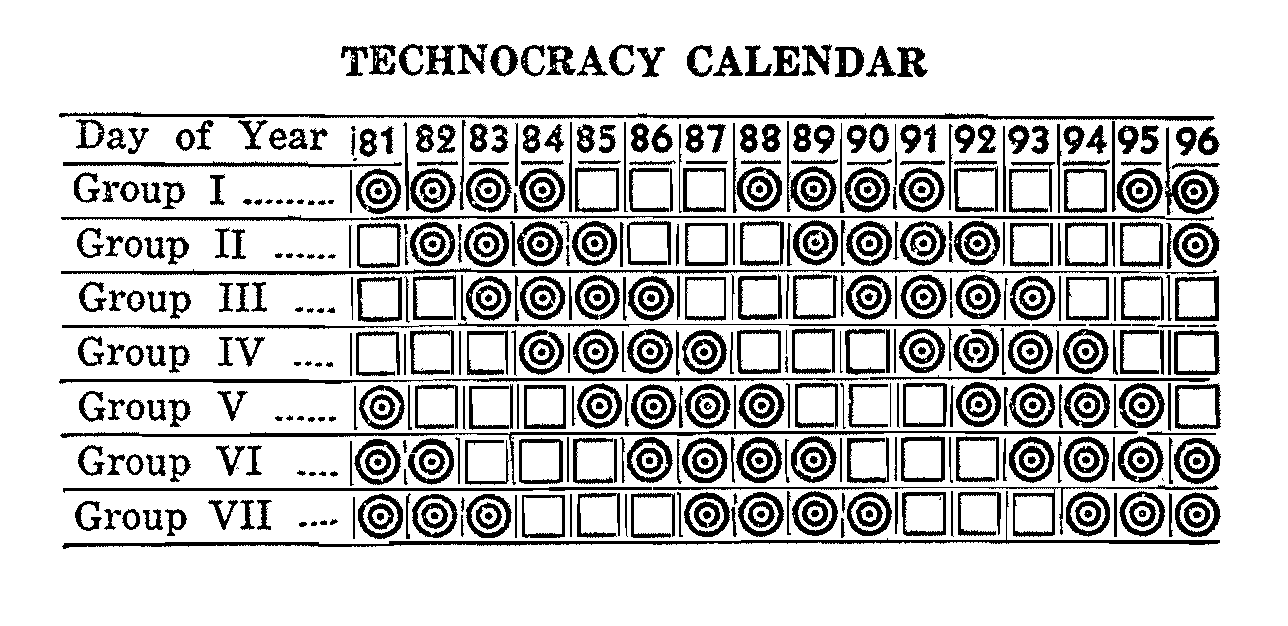
A technocratic work schedule

The technocratic movement planned to reform the work schedule, to achieve the goal of uninterrupted production, maximizing the efficiency and profitability of resources, transport and entertainment facilities, avoiding the "weekend effect".

According to the movement's calculations, it would be enough that every citizen worked a cycle of four consecutive days, four hours a day, followed by three days off. By "tiling" the days and working hours of seven groups, industry and services could be operated 24 hours a day, seven days a week. This system would include holiday periods allocated to each citizen.

=== Continental accounting system ===
From the previous research of the Technical Alliance's energy survey of North America, Technocracy Inc. leaders stated that a few key points need to be realized in order for a healthy distribution of resources to be efficiently made.

1. Register on a continuous 24-hour time period basis the total net conversion of energy, which would determine
  1. the availability of energy for continental plant construction and maintenance,
  2. the amount of physical wealth available in the form of consumable goods and services for consumption by the total population during the balanced load period
2. by means of the registration of energy converted and consumed, make possible a balanced load
3. provide a continuous 24-hour inventory of all production and consumption
4. provide a specific registration of the type, kind, size, etc., of all goods and services, where produced, and where used
5. provide specific registration of the consumption of each individual, plus a record and description of the individual
6. allow the citizen the widest latitude of choice in consuming one's individual share of continental physical wealth
7. distribute goods and services to every member of the population

==== The energy certificate and the energy distribution card ====
Replacing the price system meant figuring out a new means of measuring distribution that also needed to be based on science. This led to the technocrats concluding that measurements by units of energy was the most logical thing to do, although Thorstein Veblen's "The Engineers and the Price System" did not talk about price by energy, nor did William Henry Smyth's technocracy social universals.

Technocrats rationalized that the flow of energy can be what determines a price by energy. With the usage of all forms of energy units, especially having emphasis on the erg and joules. They came up with "energy certificates", which would have a table with the information of a citizen's identification, age, sex, occupation/location, energy allotment, purchases made, the issued date and expiration date of the certificates, formatted in a Dewey Decimal System. Each individual would be issued a booklet of the certificates. This was sometimes called an "energy distribution card".

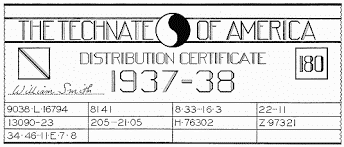
The energy certificate

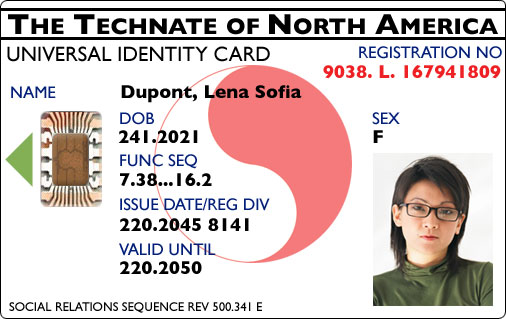
The energy distribution card

Technocrats held that the differences between energy accounting and monetary systems are:

- equal allotments of energy
  - it was suggested that citizens under the workforce age (25) would still have an allowance of energy totally independent from parents or guardians
  - retired citizens (45) would still get their allotments
  - citizens out of work would still receive their allotments
- citizens cannot trade or give away certificates. They can only spend energy at verified vendors
- once a purchase is made at a vendor, the energy used is made void; the vendor does not gain the used energy. Therefore, there is no circulation of energy or hoarding of energy
- the certificates have an expiration date. Any energy not used will become void, and on a given date the citizen will receive their new allotment of energy. Once again no citizen can hoard energy
- certificates are directly tied to an individual's ID. Therefore, it cannot be stolen or used by someone else

==== Computerization ====
The term "computer" was not used much by Howard Scott, but when it was, he used it with great optimism. Scott said technocracy's C.A.S., energy certificates, and Dewey decimal system were a more paper-based way of tracking computation; the IBM computers were exactly the kind of devices a C.A.S. would want to deploy. Scott insisted that "one of the big troubles with all of this is that your computers is going to do away with your accountants and your engineers, and it is also going to do away with your executives, as well as the blue collar and the white collar, so more power to all of the computer control mechanisms."

A year after Scott's passing, Chile started Project Cybersyn, a computerized system intended to track the economy. Philosophies of computerized government also popped up; see cyberocracy. Engineers are the central profession of technocracy's foundation, so claiming that they too will be replaced by automation is a big deal coming from a technocrat. Over the years, software for computer-aided design and the 2022 revolution of large language models brought hysteria that engineers and software developers would be replaced by artificial intelligence.

==== Growth curves ====
Justification for such a radical economy was heavily demonstrated through technocracy's growth curves of economic equilibrium.

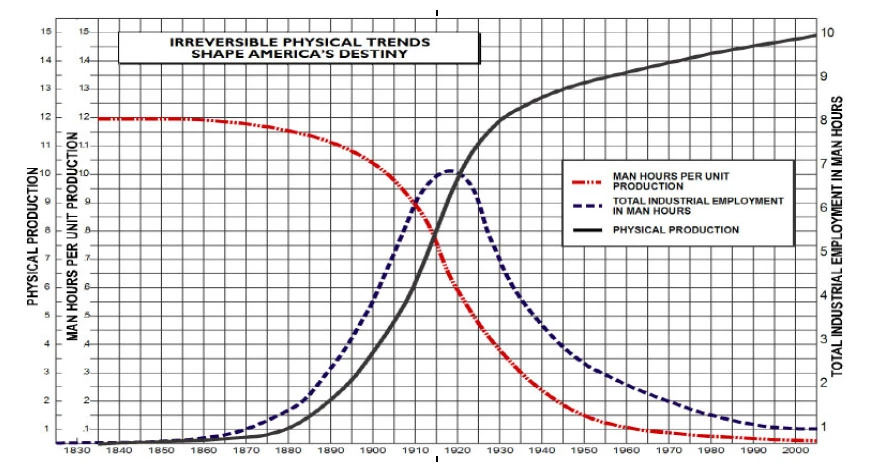
Physical trends that shape America's destiny

Their chart of "Irreversible Physical Trends Shape America's Destiny" was a continuation of the Technical Alliance's energy survey of North America, with the graph being created by the Committee of Technocracy. Upon completion, the energy survey was approximately going to have 3,000 charts finished, with every field of industry being analyzed.

According to Dr. Rautenstrauch, the committee found that the formulas technocracy worked out from business enterprise, greatly resembled the biological growth curves charted by Raymond Pearl's "Studies in Human Biology". The committee compared the Pearl-Reed equation to several major growth charts from U.S. industries and found that it fit similarly.

A foundation of technocracy's arguments was made with said chart. What it shows is that pre-industrial revolution civilization primarily generated its consumer goods from human energy—human labor. After the industrial revolution happened, a flip in dynamic changed, resulting in greater energy output with less human toil. Machinery enabled more efficient work without human muscle. To the technocrats, this shift of equilibrium was going to lead to rapid technological unemployment with no plan for the price system to navigate distribution of wealth to the unemployed population.

=== The technate ===
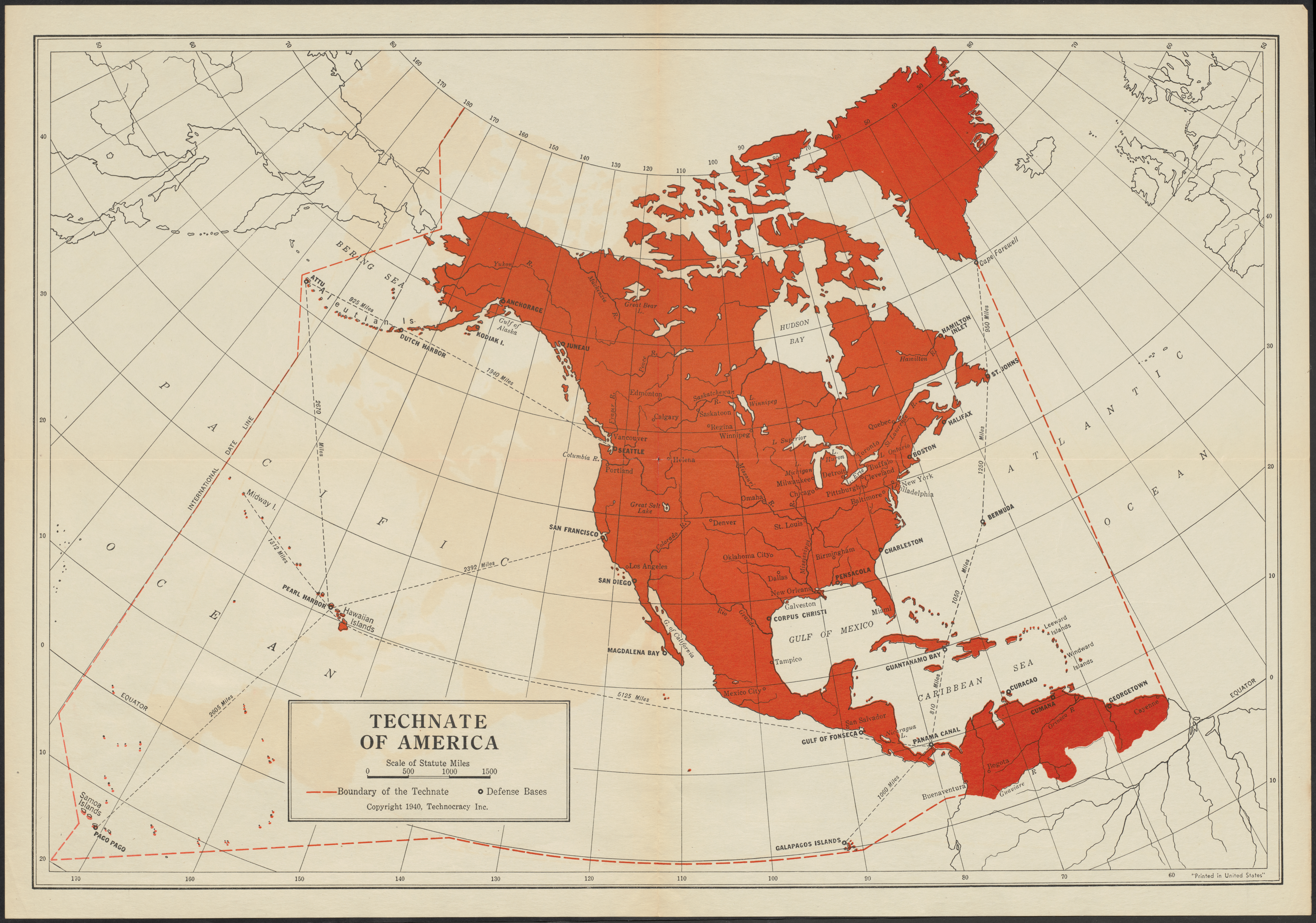
The North American technate, including Samoa

Technocracy looked for large areas with bountiful resources to enable self sufficiency. A "technate" is practically a large body of land governed by a technocracy that only needs minimal trade.

Technocrats had a strong belief in continentalism. Scott mentioned that in the case of forming a North American Technate would be like forming a federation or union under the guidance of technocracy.

==== Continental hydrology ====
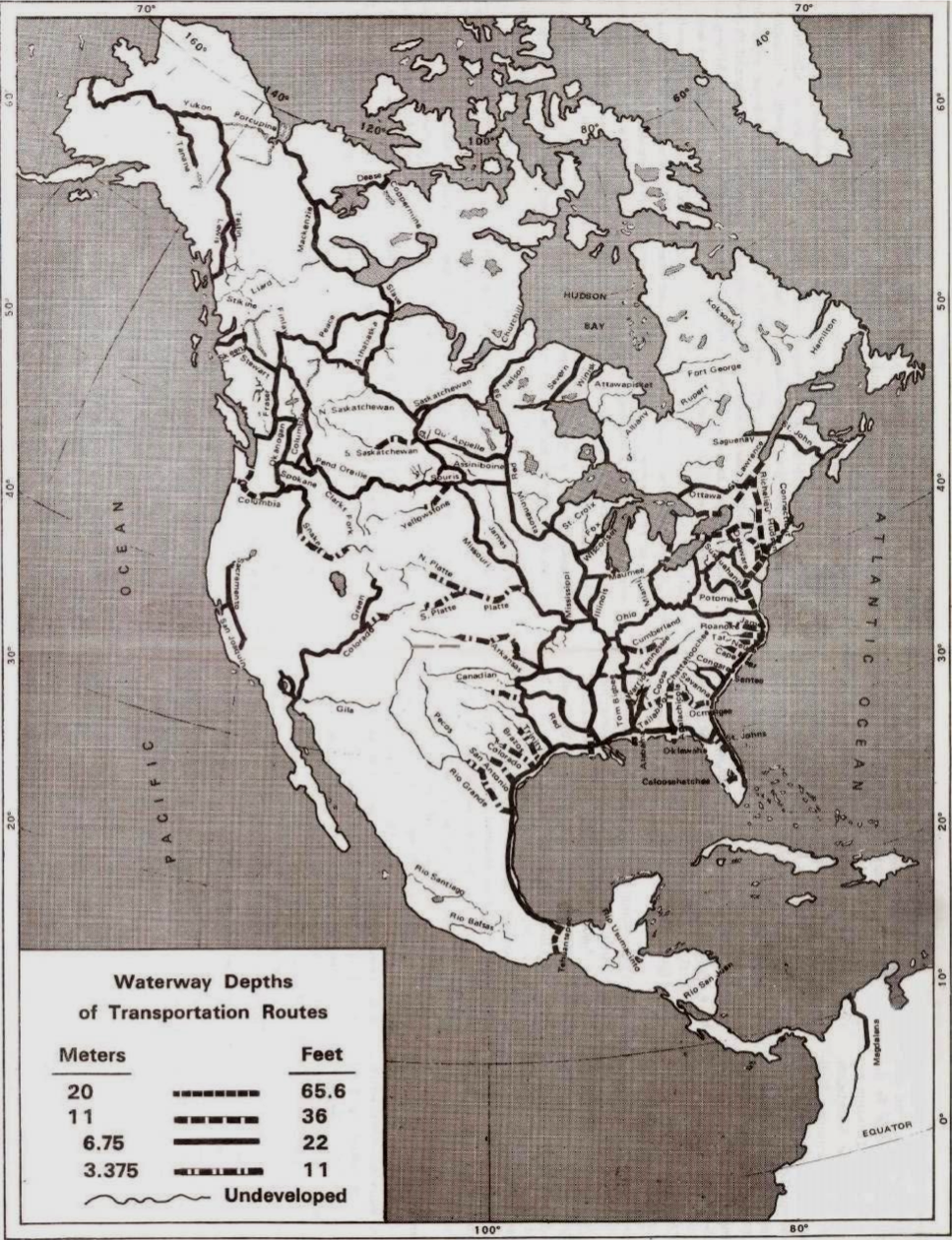
Technate hydrology

A radical plan to transform the technate's mode of transportation was to have total control over all rivers and lakes across the continent. Travel by ship was faster than car or train at the time. The continental hydrology would end up linking several rivers. It also aimed to help monitor erosion of the country, generate power, and be educational for students.

This plan faced criticism for being a project that would destroy several habitats.

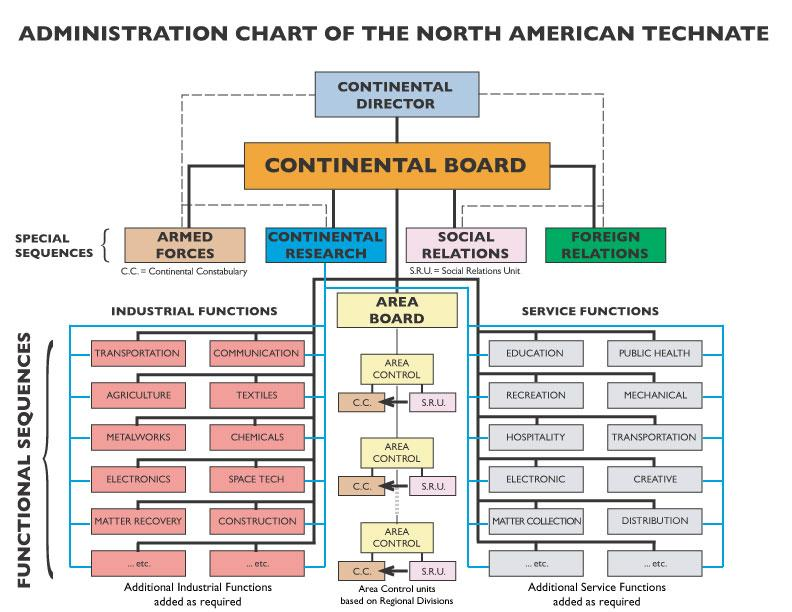
Technate administration chart

==== Technocracy organization ====
Technocracy laid out a grand scheme to organize a new government. There are a few distinct layers; the continental director, continental board, special sequences, functional sequences, and area board.

All directors are appointed from top down, with the only exception being the continental director, because no position is above it; the continental director is chosen from area control by the continental board.

The continental directors help oversee the continent. Additionally, the continental director can be thrown out should two-thirds of the continental board say so.

The continental board consists of the area control.

Technocrats wanted to divide the technate into regional divisions for administration, and decided to use the earth's latitude and longitude as a basis for calculating a "quadrangle" setup.

By this system we shall define a regional division to be a quadrangle bounded by two successive degrees of longitude and two successive degrees of latitude. The number assigned to each regional division will be that of the combined longitude and latitude of the point at the southeast corner of the quadrangle. Thus the regional division in which New York City is located is 7340; Cleveland, 8141; St. Louis, 9038; Chicago, 8741; Los Angeles, 11834; Mexico City, 9919; Edmonton, 11353, etc.

Functional sequences are filled based on what the requirements of the regional division needs are, and can be added or removed as such.

It is in this effort that the technocrats aimed to totally organize both the economic system and the government as a blend of each other. This functional government would then work towards making the continental accounting system a reality.

=== Practicable Soviet of Technicians ===
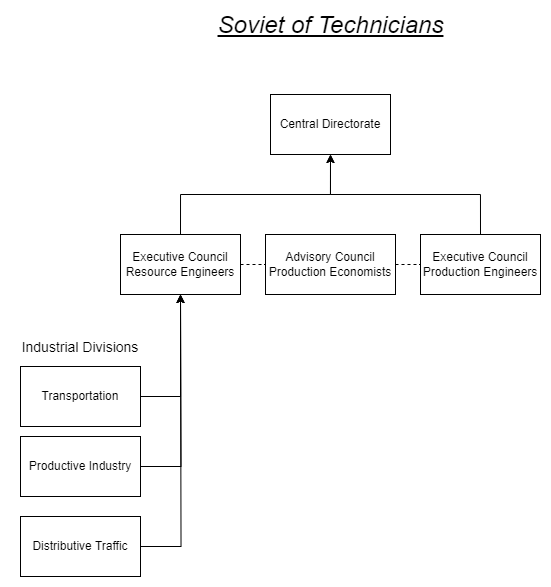
Organization chart described in the Engineers and the Price System

Thorstein Veblen outlined what it would take for engineers to manage a country's economy. Praising the idea that technicians in places of trust is an excellent idea. Veblen concluded that engineers in all fields would need to work together in accounting for all aspects of the industrial system.

Veblen loosely proposed a trilateral administration; three large councils of engineers that would lead into a central council.

- Central directorate
  - Executive council of resource engineers
  - Executive council of production engineers
  - Advisory council of production economists

==== Exclusion of business people ====
Veblen also argued that people educated in business would need to be banned from positions of trust, believing that those who understand traditional economics thought too much like a businessperson and in doing so, bring the inefficient ideals that technocracy is trying to solve.

In point: "By force of habit, men trained to a businesslike view of what is right and real will be irretrievably biased against any plan of production and distribution that is not drawn in terms of commercial profit and loss and does not provide a margin of free income to go to absentee owners. The personal exceptions to the rule are apparently few."

=== Society and equal rights ===
The technocrat writer Lila S. Wagner in "Technocracy Digest, 1st quarter 1997, No. 323" while explaining how a society would be organized under a technate stated:

"Taxes and monetary debt will be unknown. Crimes involving property -- 95% of all crime -- will no longer be a problem. Disparity between rich and poor will vanish and, with it, eventually, racism, sexism, classism, ageism — most of today's troubles."

Technocracy inc. in 1934 in the issue "Some Questions Answered" argued that in a society people should not be considered and treated inferior because of their skin color stating:

"Technocracy, being thoroughly scientific, makes no distinction of race, creed, or color. Technocracy's concern for the individual is primarily one of capacity to function. Scientists know that the so-called race problem, like most of our problems, has its roots largely in our present economic setup. When it is no longer necessary or possible for one group to achieve economic security at the expense of another, we shall find that much of the reason for racial antagonisms will have passed away."

Technocrat writer Stella K. Block in the magazine "The Northwest Technocrat, No. 281" in 1980 wrote:

"Technocracy offers to the women of North America a goal that is really worth fighting for. Technocracy offers equal incomes for all -- not merely equal pay for equal work"

"In a Technocracy, both men and women would be free to give their attention to the job, without fear of intimidation. If a person were transferred or demoted, the move would not affect his or her income; it would be guaranteed for life. Women would also be freed of having to work a "double shift." That is, after a day at the office or factory, women now generally still have to do the housework, cook or whatever; if they have a family, children, it is doubly hard."

"Women are not inferior, nor are they superior to men; they are different, but of equal importance. They are both energy-consuming biological entities. In a Technocracy, no differentiation will be made as to sex, as far as incomes are concerned. Neither the male nor female will be penalized for being male or female."

"We shall have to institute a system that treats all humans equally, male and female; black, brown, white or purple; not especially because of any humanitarian reasons, but because it is too costly and too wasteful of resources to maintain this Price System."

"The people who are advocating a return to the old-fashioned values of the Victorian "family" are blind to the reality of today's social conditions. The physical conditions that permitted the development of the "nuclear family" no longer exist. The use of extraneous energy has changed the environment to such an extent that it has made the concept irrelevant and obsolete. Divorce and remarriages have spawned an entirely different combination of "family" life: As the divorced couples re-marry, they each bring their own children into the household, plus their former in-laws, new in-laws and their offspring and other relatives of various kinds and genders. This kind of "extended" family never existed before. And there are other combinations that are vying for attention and acceptance into the concept of "family:" Homosexual couples; lesbian couples; single individuals with "live-in" partners and other combinations with people of similar tastes, et cetera, et cetera!"

== Technocracy vs. socialism ==
Many comparisons between technocracy and socialist body of thought have been made by various readers.

By definition of what the technocrat theorists argued, technocracy has not truly been implemented. There is a distinction between technocrats and socialists.

In Paul Blanshard's publication of "Technocracy and Socialism", he argued that because socialists do not want liberal democracy, that does not mean they would want a technocracy. Socialists still very much want voting. From the socialist's perspective, all workers should have a say in their organization. This would including the technocrats valued technician. Blanshard also believed that replacing the price system was not yet worth the risk, because technocracy has not fully detailed out how energy accounting would work.

Paul Temple's A Totalitarian Fantasy – Technocracy, Fascism, and the war made personal attacks on Howard Scott as he believed that Scott acted like a dictator, and that Scott's propaganda was too close to a typical fascist to be taken seriously. Temple points out that technocrats do not make the distinction of representative democracy under capitalism from a direct democracy under socialism.

Technocracy and Marxism by William Z. Foster and Earl Browder asserts that communists (as taught from Lenin and Stalin) have already realized all the issues technocrats have pointed out, years before. Howard Scott makes a bold claim that pre-industrial revolution philosophies have become totally irrelevant due to technology making a new need for a new philosophy; Foster & Browder disagree. They also point out that basing price by energy rejects the socialists measurements labor theory of value, claiming that this action is using an arbitrary unit (the erg) and was just switching one unit for another.

Leon Trotsky mentions technocracy in his pamphlet: If America Should Go Communist:

Here is where the American soviets can produce real miracles. "Technocracy" can come true only under communism, when the dead hands of private property rights and private profits are lifted from your industrial system. The most daring proposals of the Hoover commission on standardization and rationalization will seem childish compared to the new possibilities let loose by American communism.

And Trotsky's: Marxism in Our Time:

The programme of “Technocracy,” which flourished in the period of the great crisis of 1929-1932, was founded on the correct premise that economy can be rationalised only through the union of technique at the height of science and government at the service of society. Such a union is possible, provided technique and government are liberated from the slavery of private ownership. That is where the great revolutionary task begins. In order to liberate technique from the cabal of private interests and place the government at the service of society, it is necessary to “expropriate the expropriators.” Only a powerful class, interested in its own liberation and opposed to the monopolistic expropriators, is capable of consummating this task. Only in unison with a proletarian government can the qualified stratum of technicians build a truly scientific and a truly national, i.e., a socialist economy.

H. G. Wells seemed to argue for both socialism and technocracy. When Wells had a conversation with Joseph Stalin he insisted that the technical intelligentsia have begun to realize that capitalistic society has created lots of problems in all social classes. Which would bring a scientific perspective to a revolution. Stalin was not so convinced, as during previous revolutionary action those in fields of science and engineering have been more complacent than willing to help a working class movement.

Howard Scott believed that there was distinction between technocracy and socialism. He made the provocative statement: "As far as technocracy's ideas are concerned. We're so far left that we make communism look bourgeois." Scott also criticized communism as "not being radical enough", as every socialist country still used the price system. Howard Scott has also said "the red technocrats" during a meeting, further solidifying that technocracy, while not socialism, was on the left.

== Technocracy vs. fascism ==
technocracy inc is a self-declared anti-fascist organization. Scott in 1933 in his book "introduction to technocracy" defined fascism as:

"Fascism is an attempt at a last-ditch defense of a Price System, an effort to maintain an unbroken front against oncoming social change; but this unbroken front is spurious in that it is being temporarily maintained by foreign importation of energy resource materials, supplemented by the manna of the Lord"

in 1942 in the book "Total Conscription! Your Questions Answered" technocracy inc wrote:

"Technocracy was the first organization in America to protest against the use of the fascist-type of extended arm salute in our schools and public gatherings and to urge the adoption of the military style of salute for all occasions."

"Technocracy has protested for years against the shipment of metals and oil to Germany, Italy, Spain, Japan and other countries... in July 1940 Technocracy demanded Total Conscription by the Government of the United States of Men, Machines, Materiel, and Money with National Service from All and Profits to None. On December 7, 1941, Howard Scott, Director-in-Chief of Technocracy, sent a telegram to President Roosevelt in the name of the Organization placing the entire personnel and equipment of Technocracy Inc. at the disposal of the Commander-in-Chief and pledging the unqualified support of Technocracy to the Administration's war efforts. In this telegram Technocracy urged the Commander-in-Chief to ask for a declaration of war against all of the thirteen national signatories to the axis pact of fascism."

"Do we in America propose to fight fascism abroad while we encourage it at home Fascism has long permeated this country and this Continent, and the Total Conscription program of Technocracy is the only social dynamic which can successfully oppose it. America must liquidate its pro-fascists at home before it can defeat its fascist enemies abroad. Total Conscription is the structural opposite of fascism. Fascism conscripts men and women alone to do its bidding; fascism does not conscript wealth, economic privilege, and profits -- it extends them and enhances them; fascism is authoritarian the command is the will and desire of the leader. Total Conscription mobilizes not only men and women, but wealth and economic. power; Total Conscription submerges special privilege to make it one for all and all for one; Total Conscription will express the historic democracy of America by the emergency enrollment of the people and the nation's resources under designed direction of trained skill. The moment that any fascist country installs Total Conscription - of Machines, Materiel, and Money, besides its Men, it will destroy its own fascist ideology and operations, for fascism is the consolidation of a business oligarchy, an ecclesiastical oligarchy, and a political oligarchy to preserve the status quo. No fascist nation dares to place all its citizens on the same basis."

In 1944 Technocracy Inc. accused the Democratic and Republican parties of fighting fascism only for a safe world for the free enterprise in the issue "The Northwest Technocrat - Vol. 9 - No. 3 - Whole No. 99 - October 1944":

Not once did either the Democrats or the Republicans mention fascism. Apparently neither the Democrats nor the Republicans realize that a war is being fought around the globe to defeat the armies of the axis pact of fascism, a war wherein thousands of Americans have already fought and died that fascism shall be swept from the face of the earth. No speaker on the floor of either Convention exhorted his fellow delegates to fight the war against fascism to final victory. Anyone listening to the radio speeches of each Convention would have been given only one impression — that United States was fighting World War II for the sole purpose of making the world safe for free enterprise. The Republicans were careful, as were the Democrats, NOT TO GUARANTEE FULL EMPLOYMENT OR FULL PRODUCTION OR A HIGHER STANDARD OF LIVING IN THESE UNITED STATES; in fact the Republican Party in Convention assembled arrived at that wonderful conclusion where they guaranteed the citizens of United States EXACTLY NOTHING

in 1963 Scott stated:

"This organization is not fascist. It is anti-fascist. It has always been. Probably no other organization knows as much about fascism in Europe or Asia than we do; in other words, McCarthy in this country was a fascist. Let's face it. We've got a lot more. There isn't any Left in the United States. There was a Socialist Party once -Socialist Labor party -- they've practically disappeared. So all we have in the way of climatic organization is the conservative Right, the reactionary Right, and the fascist Far Right in United States. What would you call a Goldwater? As far as Technocracy's ideas are concerned, we are so far Left that we make communism look bourgeois. Left in the sense that our concepts and designs are radical and revolutionary."

months later, he stated:

we have been the chief opponents of Fascism in this country for years. Sure, we called McCarthy a Fascist when he first started out. We called the Birchites the same thing.

=== technocratic movements separated from technocracy inc destroyed by fascists. ===
The German Technocratic Society, and their journal Technokraties, was a branch of technocrats that formed independently in 1933, not long after Adolf Hitler's new role as German Chancellor. While The German Technocratic Society was not a part of the Nazi Party, they did face perpetual pressure to fall in line with the Third Reich. Their first publication stayed polite towards the regime, in saying they needed to breakaway from the American movement. This was a dilemma for the German Technocrat Movement, as the Nazis were seen as irrational. Hans Triebel, a member of the Third Reich, tried making compromises between the Technocratic Society and Reich.

Despite Triebel's interest in making the German Technocratic Society compatible with the Reich, there was a survey done, recounting the past three years of the German Technocratic Society; and it was found that the German technocrats kept ties with the American movement, with the publications of the American technocrats being translated to German, including a British article that praised the well known Jewish physicist Albert Einstein. The Nazi Party did not allow for a German Technocracy Movement, once these translations became known, the German Technocratic Society came to a sudden end in 1935.

Scott mentioned during a membership meeting:

Before the war, in 1932, '33, and '34, there was the Deutsche Technokratische Gesellschaft in Germany with some of the outstanding ... a very interesting group of Dutch scientists and engineers. They lasted, of course, until 1940 when the German Fascist troops invaded Holland.

In France, there is a Movement de l' Abondance, which today has two newspapers, radio programs. We don't care what they call it off this continent. They can call it Technocracy or an abundance movement, or a Come-to-Jesus movement if they want. That's their privileges because they're not connected with us as an organization; but if they wished to use Technocracy as a body of thought and its literature, they're perfectly privileged to do so.

Of course, in Italy, Mussolini – just before he, let's say, corroborated the Rooseveltian statement of the "stab in the back", arrested 26 scientists and engineers for advocating Technocrazia Italia, and they were sentenced to ten years cofino. They were liberated by the Allied troops when the Allied troops liberated Lipari. They were returned to North America.

The Norwegian Teshnisha Octe Bolaga, that, too, was extinguished by German Fascism, but there are signs of life.

Way out in Indonesia, the interview with the American press of the Premier of the Indonesian Republic, he stated the other day that what the Indonesians wanted – when some smart American newspaperman asked him if the Indonesians weren't slightly indolent, that they were charged by the Dutch with being lazy – he said, "No, they're not lazy. They merely don't see any sense in work. What we want out here is what you call Technocracy in United States."

== Art representations of technocracy ==
The technocracy movement has made way for various pieces of artwork, from illustrations, and photography, to video games, and music.

=== Technocracy Inc.'s general aesthetics ===
Card-carrying members were issued a monad lapel pin or patch, and would wear gray suits during events and meetings. They were encouraged to paint their cars gray as well. A few published technocracy books are mainly gray. The chosen color of technocracy, is gray. Howard Scott viewed a repetition of an official uniform would help spread a national identity for technocrats, and pique onlookers curiosity into the movement.

A common theme with technocracy's publications are images of industrial equipment's and factories.

Science Vs. Chaos! By Howard Scott	Original study course by M. King Hubbert	A cluster of different publications by Technocracy Inc.

Technocracy also had other items with propaganda slogans on them, such as the case with the following technocracy match covers.

Match cover front view	Match cover back view	Match cover inside view
Match cover outside view	Match cover inside view	

=== Technocrat robots ===
Illustrations of robots as representations of technocrats.

The Technocrats Magazine	Illustration used in The Technocrats Magazine	A birthday card from the 1930s displaying a technocrat robot. Note the sender's observation: "Aunt Mary, with yellow hair + rouge"

One of the technocrats' magazines featured a humanoid robot, with the cover showing the robot as a destructive force. Inside the magazine it shows the same robot overseer of civilization, and a robot is also representative of a technocrat from a cartoon artwork for a birthday card, although the artist seems to be confused as to what a technocrat is.

Article on technocracy published by San Francisco Examiner

An apparently anti-technocracy article that seems to claim that technocrats incorrectly call industrial machinery a "curse." Hence, the robot dinosaur destroying a city.

=== Technocracy music and dance ===
A dance was named after technocracy at the Roseland Dance Hall. Supporters from Vancouver created a technocracy orchestra.

=== Influence in literature ===
Some science fiction has featured the term technocracy or a society governed by technical experts, which has resulted in both modern popularity in favor of a technically run society, and fear of a technically run society.

==== Isaac Asimov ====
After Howard Scott's passing, Technocracy Inc. was failing to keep their relevancy. In efforts to gain popular attention, the organization tried to interact with writers who expressed techno-utopian ideas with the hope that gaining them as members would convince their audience to investigate technocracy. These efforts included writing to Isaac Asimov, although there does not appear to be information as to whether or not Asimov responded to Technocracy Inc.'s letters.

For some time, Asimov was a member of the Futurians, a science fiction club based in New York, some of the members of which were reportedly interested in technocracy. This interest would be short-lived, however, as after obtaining a copy of the technocracy study course, they determined that it was no different from "progressive Stalinism". There is no available information confirming if Asimov took part in reading the study course.

==== H. G. Wells ====
Wells was aware of the technocracy movement, making a reference to it in his book, The Shape of Things to Come.

In America an interesting movement known as 'Technocracy' was attracting attention. Essentially that was a soundly scientific effort to restate economics on a purely physical basis. But it was exploited in a journalistic fashion and presented to a remarkably receptive public as a cut-and-dried scheme for a new social order in which social and economic life was to be treated as an energy system controlled by 'experts'.

The explicit repudiation of democratic control by the Technologists at that date is very notable. The unit of energy was to be the basis of a new currency. So every power station became a mint and every waterfall a potential 'goldmine', and the money and the energy in human affairs remained practically in step.

— The Shape of Things to Come, Book 3 Section 1. The plan of the Modern State is worked out

A bit further, in Book 3 Section 3. The technical revolutionary, scientists start taking a stand in Britain, and the technologists begin "invading" politics. Characters like Professor of Engineering Miles Walker and "Professor Soddy" represent the shift towards progressive policies made by technicians.

==== O. F. Brusha ====
Author of "This Is It!" Our Bountiful America, an alternate history of how the North American Technate would operate, through the perspective of Continental Board Directors and their tour to foreign diplomats.

== See also ==
- Abundance
- Continentalism
- Cybernetics
- Cyberocracy
- Futurism
- Kardashev scale
- Machine Age
- Scientism
- Scientocracy
- Technocracy
- Technological utopianism
- Thermoeconomics
- The Engineers and the Price System
- The Venus Project
- Positivism
- Post-scarcity

People:

- Stuart Chase
