= The Industrial Pioneer =

Trade publication of the Industrial Workers of the World

The Industrial Pioneer: an Illustrated Labor Magazine
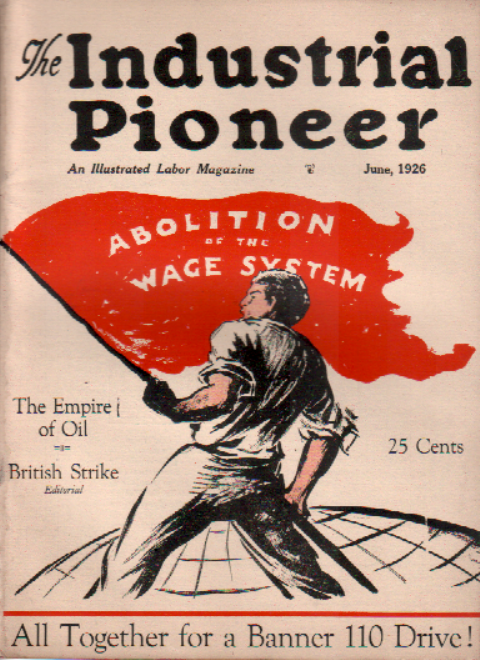
- Cover of The Industrial Pioneer, June 1926
- Former editors: Vern Smith
- Staff writers: Ralph Chaplin
- Frequency: Monthly
- Publisher: General Executive Board, Industrial Workers of the World
- First issue: February 1921
- Final issue: September 1926
- Country: United States
- Language: English

The Industrial Pioneer was a monthly publication of the Industrial Workers of the World (IWW) from 1921 to 1926. It was published in Chicago by the general executive board of the IWW, under various editors. The precursor of the Industrial Pioneer was The One Big Union Monthly.

The editor of One Big Union Monthly, John Sandgren, used his position to wage war on the Communists in the IWW. When his editorials became too sectarian, the IWW replaced him as editor in 1931, and changed the name of the publication to the Industrial Pioneer. The new editor was a Communist, however, and this alienated the non-Communist majority of IWW members. He was removed as editor in 1922.

By the end of 1923, the IWW publications Industrial Pioneer and Industrial Worker were both nearly bankrupt. An organizer with experience in the Oklahoma oil fields, Frank Gallagher, became business manager for both. The Industrial Pioneer lived on, but after the 1924 split in the IWW, the union's decline as an actual labor organization is visible in the Industrial Pioneer, which became more purely educational and historical in flavor.

In the words of IWW historian Melvyn Dubofsky, the Industrial Pioneer is "one of the finest examples of the poetry, prose, fiction, art, and socioeconomic analysis produced in America's past by self-educated working-class radicals." The Industrial Pioneer reflected the strong influence of Marxism within the IWW, as well as an activist emphasis on workers' emancipation through control of industry. One academic article that refers to the Industrial Pioneer describes this intellectual culture of the IWW using the library of John Edwin Peterson, a rank-and-file Wobblie: "Articles on the economic and technological development of the modern railway industry in the Industrial Pioneer were studied along with Pullman production manuals for the day when workers like Peterson would take over production." This focus on analyzing the nuts and bolts of capitalist industry went hand in hand with a desire to eliminate the wastefulness endemic to capitalism. In 1920, the IWW created the Bureau of Industrial Research to address such issues, in part due to the influence of the technocratic ideas of Howard Scott. In 1921, a series of articles by or about the Bureau appeared in the Industrial Pioneer.

Some of the regular features of the Industrial Pioneer were a section called "The Question Box," where readers wrote in to have their questions answered, a humor section called "Wobbles," a poetry section, numerous cartoons, and a page advertising subscriptions to the magazine. In 1923, for example, one could order an annual subscription to the Industrial Pioneer, and receive a book such as Karl Marx's Capital, Volume I along with the subscription, for a total of $3.25. Prominent IWW cartoonists such as Maurice Becker and Dust were regularly featured in the magazine. A good deal of space was often devoted to fiction and poetry. As the initial announcement in the Industrial Pioneer's first issue makes clear, the magazine dedicated itself not just to addressing labor and economic issues, but to providing a forum for "proletarian art."

The topic of Communism was clearly important for the IWW. The first, pro-Communist editor of the Industrial Pioneer published articles by Communists like Solomon Lozovsky and Karl Radek, but was not simply preaching Bolshevism. While he is uncritical of Communist tactics in Russia, he makes clear that purely economic action is called for in the United States. A later editor, writing an editorial on the death of Lenin in 1924, provides a typical Wobblie assessment: he praises Lenin's idealism, but notes that Lenin could not save the top-heavy "workers' dictatorship," which rested on the misconception that "all power resides in the state."

Other topics treated in the Industrial Pioneer include relations between the sexes (Jennie Wilson, "Modern Romance," May, 1923 issue), evolutionary theory (J. Howard Moore, "Savage Survivals in Higher Peoples," June, 1923 issue), immigration ("Some Anti-Immigration Fallacies," October, 1923 issue), and race relations ("The Negro—A Subject Race," April, 1924 issue). The Industrial Pioneer published some noteworthy figures in American labor history, including Eugene V. Debs, Bartolomeo Vanzetti, Ricardo Flores Magon, and Upton Sinclair.

Upton Sinclair, for example, was involved with the free speech fight that grew out of a strike in San Pedro in 1923, and the August, 1923 issue of the Industrial Pioneer covers these events. Due to Sinclair's advocacy for free speech, the editor of the Industrial Pioneer wrote to Sinclair, and Sinclair wrote an article on "Civil Liberties in Los Angeles," which criticized arrests for "criminal syndicalism." In addition, "The national office of the IWW began to give space in the Industrial Pioneer to reviews of Sinclair's literary efforts and sought to enlist him as a California speaker in its campaign for amnesty for political prisoners."
