= Technocracy =

Form of government run by experts

Technocracy is an expert-based type of governance. In the strongest sense, it is a form of government in which decisions across all sectors and policy domains follow evidence-based, efficiency-oriented procedures grounded in scientific methods and instrumental rationality. In a weaker sense, the term refers to hybrid models that delegate specific functions to experts or implement expertise-driven decision procedures in areas such as central banking, public health, or environmental regulation.

Technocracy is often regarded as a challenge to democracy since it grounds political legitimacy in elite expertise, while democracy justifies itself as the rule of the people. One approach to resolving their tensions suggests that democratically elected officials choose political goals, while technocrats choose the most efficient ways to realize those goals, serving as advisors and implementers. Technocracy is closely related to meritocracy, expertocracy, epistocracy, managerialism, and algocracy. It contrasts with populism, which frames politics as a struggle between common people and a perceived elite.

Proponents of technocracy argue that scientific expertise and evidence-guided policy produce better outcomes. They hold that technocracy offers a value-neutral approach that best serves the long-term welfare of society as a whole. Opponents contend that technocracy is anti-democratic by excluding large segments of the population from politics, that the claim to neutrality masks value-laden choices, and that science alone is insufficient for political decisions.

Early contributions to the idea of technocracy appeared in the utopian visions of Plato, Francis Bacon, and Henri de Saint-Simon. The notion of science- and rationality-based governance gained prominence during the Enlightenment and became increasingly influential as industrial and post-industrial transformations made societies more complex. Notable examples of technocratic influence are found in the North American technocracy movement of the 1930s, Soviet and Chinese centralized planning, developmental efforts in Latin America and Singapore, and the institutional architecture of the European Union.

== Definition ==
Technocracy is a form of government or an approach to political action that emphasizes expertise, but its precise definition is disputed. One characterization focuses on who makes decisions, defining technocracy as rule by experts in contrast to democracy as rule by the people. Another centers on decision procedures rather than rulers, highlighting the role of technical skills, scientific evidence, and instrumental rationality. (Note: Instrumental rationality is a form of reason that seeks appropriate and effective means to achieve a goal.) More abstractly, technocracy can be defined as the view that the main source of political legitimacy is expert-driven reasoning and specialized knowledge, rather than popular will or hereditary entitlement.

In its strongest sense, technocracy means that all main governmental operations follow technocratic principles. Because pure technocracy is typically not found in real-world conditions, the term is often used in a weaker sense to describe leadership styles or institutions that apply such principles within other forms of government, such as a democratically elected leader who relies heavily on expert advice, or a central bank in which unelected experts set monetary policy based on technical criteria.

A hallmark of technocracy is its science-focused approach. It frames policy objectives, resource allocation, and administrative procedures in terms of evidence-based and efficiency-oriented processes that follow a rigorous methodology and give priority to quantifiable results. It typically employs cost–benefit analysis and risk management, intended to improve the long-term prosperity of society as a whole rather than serving the partisan interests of specific groups. Advocates of technocracy emphasize the method's objective and impartial character, but its claims to value-neutrality and freedom from ideology are contested. Technocracy is normally considered a form of elitism since large parts of the population may lack the technical knowledge and specialized skills required to participate in complex policy decisions. Anti-pluralism is another frequently discussed feature. It reflects the commitment to the singular interest of the long-term social welfare of the whole community in contrast to political processes that mediate among competing interests and preferences of distinct groups.

A technocrat is someone who supports or implements technocracy. (Note: The term is sometimes used in a derogatory sense to imply an overemphasis of technology and a lack of awareness of moral and humanistic considerations.) A technotopia is an idealized society or government model in which all major aspects of governance are guided by technical expertise. The term technocracy comes from the Ancient Greek words τέχνη (tékhnē), meaning 'skill' or 'craft', and κράτος (krátos), meaning 'power' or 'rule'. Its earliest known use dates to the 1890s. The English-born American engineer William H. Smyth is usually credited with coining the modern meaning of the term in 1919. He used it in the title of a series of articles advocating science-based politics. The term's popularity increased in the 1930s as part of the technocracy movement.

== Areas and approaches ==
Technocratic principles can be applied to different areas of governance and implemented in several ways. In a pure technocracy, this theoretical ideal would guide decision-making processes in all sectors and policy domains. However, not all policy areas are equally amenable to technocratic management, which typically works better for areas with clearly defined policy goals, quantifiable metrics, and reliable evidence. In practice, technocracy usually manifests as a hybrid model integrated with other approaches to governance, creating systems in which expertise- and evidence-based processes influence some areas more strongly than others.

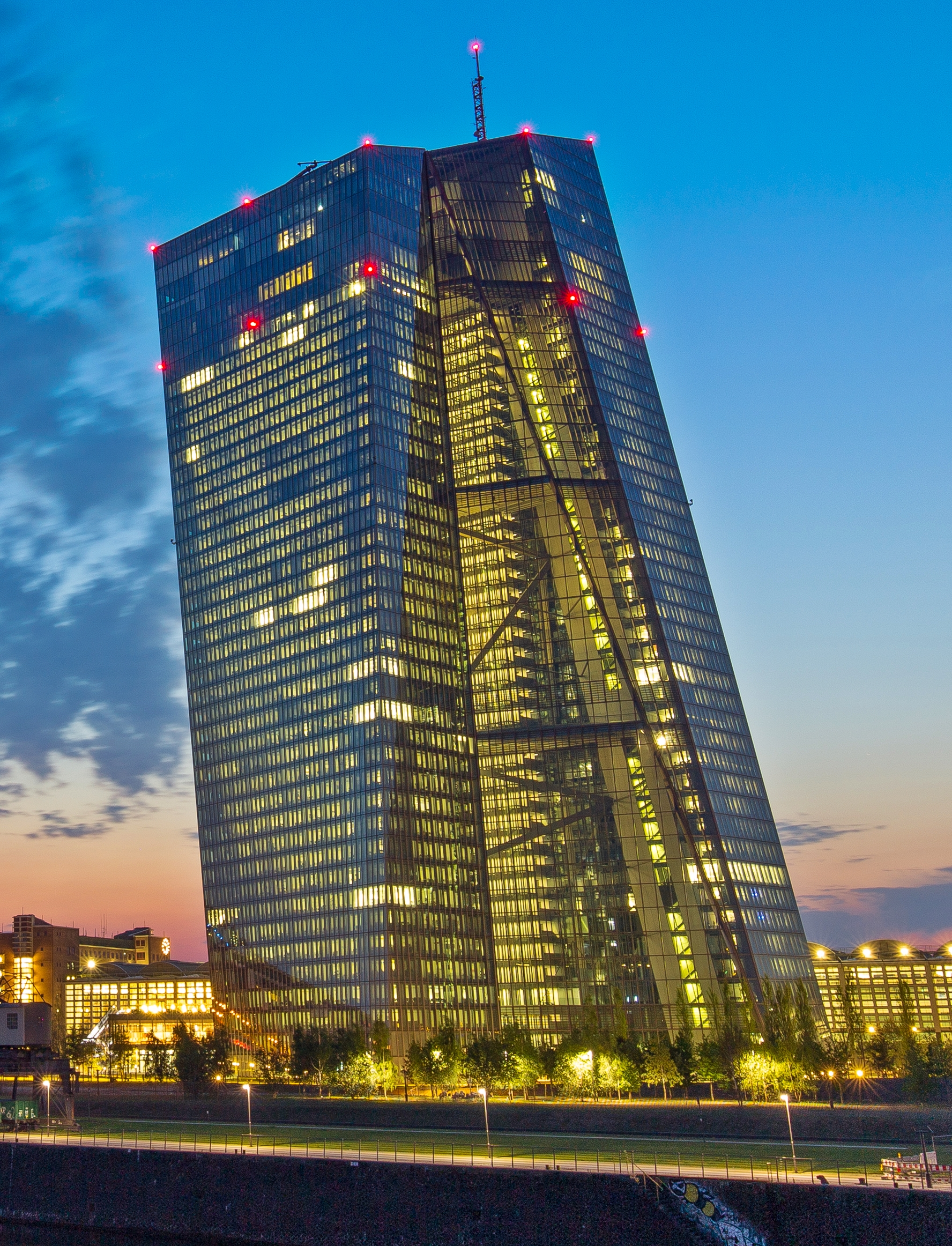
Central banks, such as the European Central Bank, often rely on financial experts operating relatively independently from electoral processes.

One key area is the central banking system, in which financial experts often operate independently of electoral processes. Central banks are responsible for monetary policy and financial stability. For example, they typically control the base interest rate to promote price stability, high employment, and economic growth. Their decisions are based on diverse technical indicators, such as inflation and unemployment rates, weighing trade-offs among their objectives to achieve a prudent balance. Other economy-related aspects of technocratic governance include fiscal policy, taxation, and the management of financial crises.

Technocratic principles are also applied to the area of healthcare. Expert panels may implement reforms to medical training, increase reliance on medical technology, design and evaluate vaccination programs, adjust drug policy, and coordinate responses during health crises, such as pandemics. Technocratic attempts to improve the effectiveness of healthcare systems through efficient resource allocation may depersonalize the doctor–patient relationship and lead to reductions in public health services by cutting cost-ineffective interventions to prioritize high-impact treatments.

In the field of education, the influence of technocracy can take various forms. Experts may revise curricula and propose reforms, often with an emphasis on centralization while reducing the autonomy of local institutions. This approach is usually accompanied by standardization, such as the implementation of standardized testing and quantifiable metrics to track educational progress. Another facet is the integration of modern technology into classrooms, including computers, the internet, and artificial intelligence. A further intersection is found in educational institutions or programs that prepare elite students for expert roles in governance, such as specialized schools or competitive selection processes that filter candidates for senior civil service careers.

In environmental policy, technocratic principles are used to adjust regulations to ecological issues, ranging from climate change to water quality and biodiversity conservation. Other relevant areas include urban planning, energy infrastructure, and research funding.

In addition to the variety of policy areas, there are also different ways of implementing technocratic principles. One model casts technocrats as advisors who collect and interpret empirical evidence, devise policy options, and evaluate their advantages and disadvantages. In this role, technocrats do not hold immediate decision-making powers but wield influence indirectly by shaping how leaders understand and choose among alternatives. In contrast to this advisory model, other approaches invest technocrats with direct authority to implement political decisions. Technocracy can also shape governance by implementing decision-making procedures and bureaucratic systems, shifting the emphasis from who holds office to how decisions are made. In this case, technocratic power resides more in administrative mechanisms and organizational arrangements than in individual experts.

Another approach focuses on information technology to assist or automate political decisions. For example, algocracy relies on algorithms and artificial intelligence to analyze data and devise policies. Proposed models vary in the role of humans, ranging from humans as primary decision-makers assisted by artificial intelligence to fully automated systems. Cyberocracy, a similar concept, envisions a future form of government in which information and access to information technology are the primary sources of political power.

Technocrats typically aim for the long-term prosperity of the community as a whole, but this goal can be interpreted in different ways. Approaches based on Keynesianism seek to achieve it through economic growth and fair redistribution, relying on an extensive bureaucracy and comprehensive planning. Neoliberal models, by contrast, seek to promote community well-being through competition among individuals and organizations, centering technocratic policies on competitive frameworks and risk management.

== Relation to other political ideologies ==
=== Democracy ===
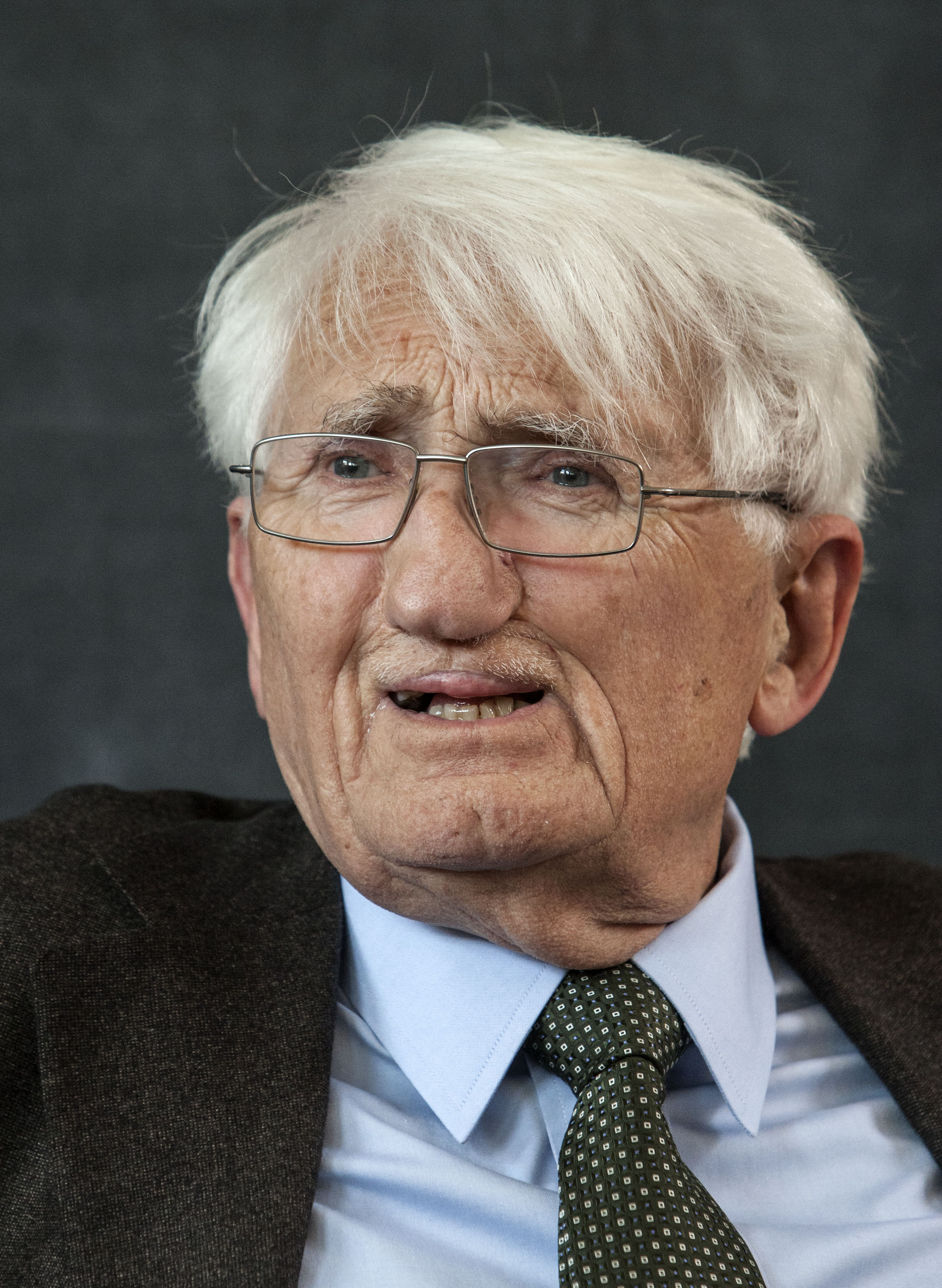
Jürgen Habermas argued that expert knowledge should be integrated into democratic processes without replacing them.

Academic discussions of technocracy examine its relation to other political ideologies, such as democracy. Democracy vests political power in the people. Citizens have the most immediate control in direct democracy, where they participate by voting on laws and policies. In indirect democracy, they elect representatives who decide on the public's behalf.

Technocracy is often framed as a challenge or alternative to democracy. This view emphasizes their contrasting principles of political legitimacy and decision-making. Technocracy grounds authority in expertise and technical knowledge, resulting in decisions that may not align with popular opinion or the consent of the governed. As a result, democratic accountability to voter preferences is subordinated to the responsibility of pursuing the long-term common good. Another key difference concerns decision-making processes. In democracies, they often happen through confrontation and negotiation among competing interest groups and viewpoints, while technocracies rely on evidence-based analysis and expert deliberation. This is typically accompanied by depoliticization, wherein contentious issues are framed as neutral technical problems. Democratic processes, by contrast, may acknowledge evaluative differences and seek to mediate among them. Although technocracy does not restrict political participation through rigid hereditary or class systems, its reliance on specialized expertise often excludes large segments of the population and marginalizes lay perspectives.

A contrasting view rejects the claim that democracy and technocracy are incompatible, seeing them instead as complementary approaches whose tensions can be resolved. One outlook argues that technocracy is primarily about instrumental rationality, or how to choose the means to achieve a given goal. According to this view, the people or elected officials choose political goals while the technocrats choose the most efficient ways to realize those goals, acting as advisors and implementers. Another approach confines technocracy to certain institutions or functions within a government. For example, a democratically elected government may delegate monetary policy or public health reforms to expert panels. In this context, one argument holds that every government relies on technocratic principles to some degree by consulting experts and aligning policy to empirical evidence.

The compatibility of democracy and technocracy may also depend on social circumstances. Beneficial conditions for technocratic democracies include a broad consensus on the general goals of state policy, a willingness of individuals to accept short-term personal sacrifices for the sake of the long-term prosperity of the community, and public trust in technocrats' ability to serve the public interest effectively.

=== Populism ===
Technocracy is commonly contrasted with populism, which claims to promote the interests of the common people. Populism typically frames politics as a struggle between morally pure people and a corrupt, self-serving elite. It usually promotes a personalistic leader who seeks to mobilize the masses by appealing to popular sentiment and who is regarded as a direct representative of the will of the people.

In several respects, populism is directly opposed to technocracy. Its skeptical attitude toward elitism and expert rule challenges the technocratic reliance on expertise and specialized knowledge. This tension is also reflected in the sources of political legitimacy: populism emphasizes mass mobilization and the representation of popular opinion, whereas technocracy sees evidence-based competence and scientific rationality as primary sources of authority.

However, there are also aspects in which populism and technocracy overlap. Both are seen as challenges or threats to democracy, in part because of their anti-pluralistic outlooks. In populism, this tendency is expressed in its claim to represent a unified popular will, dismissing dissenting views as betrayals of the people's true interests. In technocracy, dissenting views are often portrayed as irrational or biased positions that do not align with expert opinions on how to promote the long-term prosperity of the community as a whole.

Techno-populism attempts to reconcile these two approaches. It combines the populist promise to represent the will of the people with a claim to legitimacy based on expertise, usually coupled with a technology-focused outlook.

=== Others ===
As a form of elitism, technocracy vests political power in a small group of technical experts. Other types of elitism have different criteria of political inclusion. Aristocracy has a social class of ruling elites, typically grounded in hereditary birth and inherited titles. Plutocracy places political authority in the hands of the wealthy. Theocracy merges political and religious power, justifying its authority by appeal to a divine command. Elitism contrasts with political egalitarianism, which promotes an equal distribution of political power, such as the democratic principle "one person, one vote".

Technocracy is closely related to meritocracy, which highlights the principle of merit by selecting people based on their ability. It can apply to governmental positions or, more broadly, to any social function or job. The core idea is that everybody has the position they deserve. Expertocracy is sometimes defined as a weaker form of technocracy that seeks to align decision-making processes with expert opinions without transferring power to technical elites. (Note: In a different sense, expertocracy can also mean that experts seize power from democratically elected officials.) Other related political ideologies include epistocracy, which asserts that the degree of political influence of citizens should correspond to their competence in political decision-making, and managerialism, which advocates business-like and efficiency-driven management techniques. The relation between technology, politics, and the economy is also relevant to techno-progressivism, which seeks to improve social conditions through technological progress; techno-corporatism, in which politics is influenced by interests of technology-focused corporations; and technocapitalism, a form of capitalism centered on technological innovation.

Through its emphasis on value-neutrality, technocracy contrasts with political ideologies that explicitly advance substantive values or normative goals, such as liberalism, socialism, and nationalism. Liberalism promotes personal freedom, individual rights, tolerance, the rule of law, and the protection of private property. Socialism prioritizes economic equality, social welfare, and collective ownership. Nationalism values social cohesion grounded in national identity and shared customs, culture, and language. Technocracy typically seeks to sideline evaluative and ideological commitments by framing decisions around empirical evidence and cost–benefit analysis rather than pursuing substantive values. However, there are hybrid approaches that combine technocracy with certain normative goals, as in neoliberal technocracy and technocratic socialism.

Technocracy is sometimes contrasted with authoritarianism, which seeks to centralize and monopolize political power in a single leader or party and uses a hierarchical structure to suppress dissent. However, authoritarian regimes may adopt technocratic principles to consolidate control and justify their legitimacy by appealing to efficiency and expertise, giving rise to techno-authoritarianism.

== Arguments ==
=== For ===
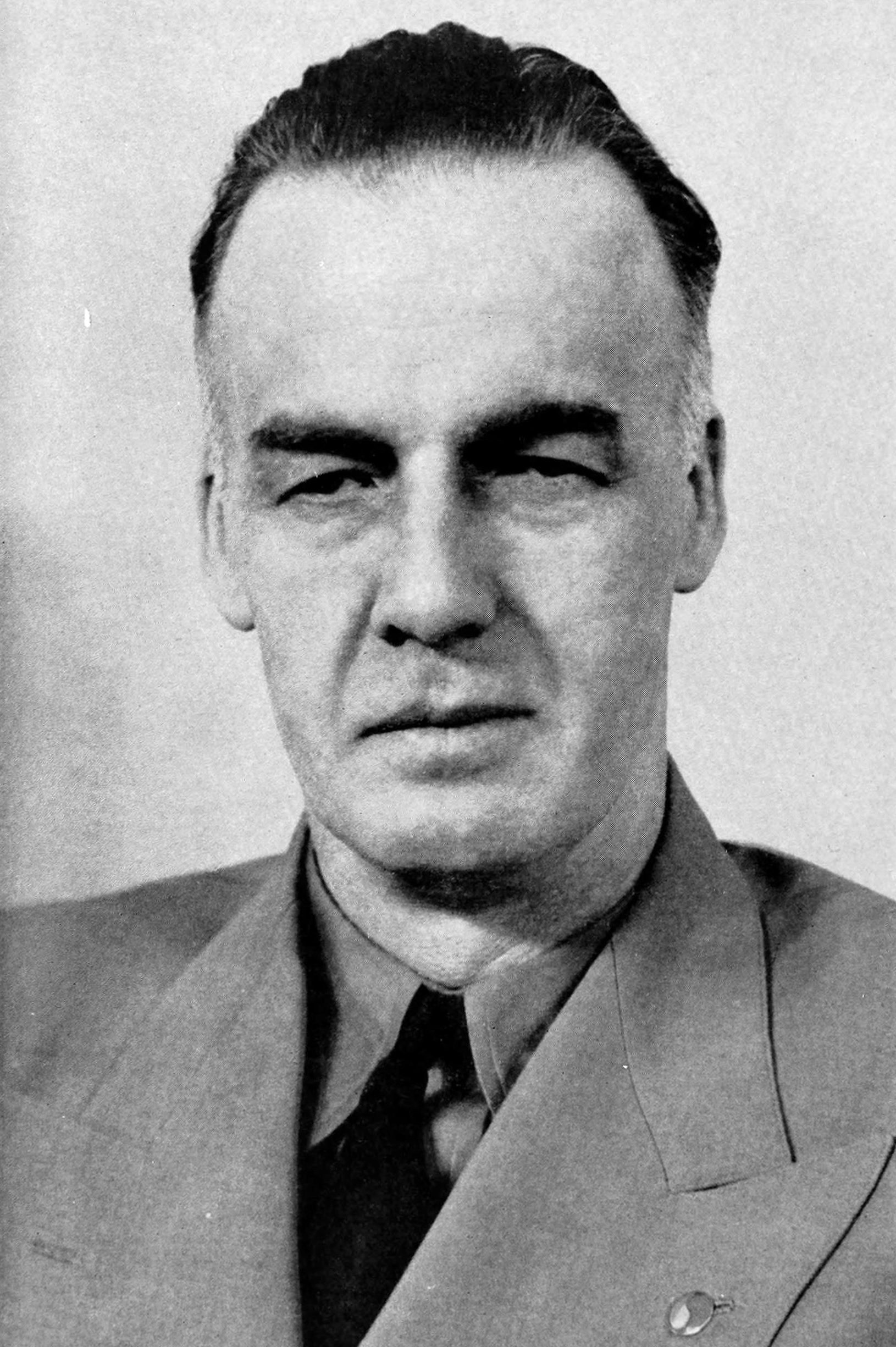
Howard Scott, a leading figure of the Technical Alliance and Technocracy Inc., held that technocratic governance can maximize efficiency and increase abundance.

Political theorists discuss various arguments for and against technocracy. Advocates emphasize the central role of skill and competence in political decision-making. They argue that political situations are complex, particularly in a globalized world marked by rapid technological advances. These complexities make it difficult to consider all relevant factors, predict outcomes of increasingly interconnected processes, and adjust policies accordingly. This view holds that scientific expertise and evidence-guided inquiry offer a better foundation for effective political decisions than ideological doctrine or popular sentiment. Technocrats highlight the rationality and efficiency of their procedures, which seek to avoid contradictory and irrational elements found in approaches that rely on partisan interests and public opinion. Accordingly, they promise better outcomes, benefiting the community as a whole through material progress.

Another line of argument centers on value-neutrality. It asserts that the technocratic focus on objective analysis and scientific solutions promotes the implementation of optimal solutions that prioritize overall welfare. Advocates hold that the ideal of serving the community as a whole helps insulate policy from partisan agendas and lobbying efforts that privilege specific interest groups. They argue that the emphasis on competence, transparent decision criteria, and quantifiable results constitutes a form of meritocratic fairness that can safeguard against corruption and nepotism.

A different set of arguments focuses on the long-term perspective. It asserts that technocracies are better suited to implement necessary but unpopular reforms that benefit the community in the long run. This view maintains that expert-driven political legitimacy sidelines short-term electoral pressures or incentives to maximize popular approval through immediate benefits. Supporters further highlight technocracy's openness to innovation in response to scientific or technological advancements and flexibility to adapt policy to emerging challenges or new data.

=== Against ===
Critics of technocracy often focus on its anti-democratic tendencies, viewing it as a form of elitism that excludes large segments of the population from political participation. They argue that governance should align with public consent and reflect a diversity of opinions and preferences. In their view, technocracy alienates ordinary people from politics by framing policy choices as purely technical problems. A related concern is that technocratic decision-makers are not directly accountable to the electorate, raising questions about their political legitimacy and the risk of a technology-justified authoritarianism.

Another criticism rejects the claim that technocracy is value-neutral. It argues that the reliance on scientific methods, quantitative metrics, and efficiency carries implicit evaluative biases, meaning that ideological commitments and value conflicts are not removed but merely hidden under the guise of objective analysis. A related objection holds that a technocratic focus on instrumental rationality reduces political decisions to problems of optimization and neglects the intrinsic worth of individuals. It contends that instrumental rationality about the best means to achieve a goal needs to be accompanied by normative rationality about which goals are worth pursuing. This view asserts that there are competing proposals about what is ultimately good for society and that politics should include collective evaluation of these proposals instead of reducing political deliberation to a selection of efficient means. Another challenge holds that the technocratic claim to neutrality can hide partisan agendas, such as attempts by corporate lobbies to influence policy under the guise of impartial optimization.

Critics also target the strong focus on science and the claim that technocracies achieve better outcomes. They argue that technocracy adopts scientism, the view that science is the only reliable path to knowledge, and falsely assumes that science can solve all political problems. Critics assert that the scientific method is limited and cannot reliably predict social outcomes, specifically in complex and interconnected systems of human behavior. Many aspects of social life are difficult to quantify, and efforts to do so can result in misleading metrics that ignore key factors. This can produce implementation gaps in which idealized models fail in real-world conditions. Similarly, general models may neglect factors that are only relevant in specific local contexts, leading to unexpected results when trying to impose uniform solutions in unique situations. Another line of criticism points to expert disagreements. It holds that technocracies are challenged by disputes between competing theories that predict divergent outcomes without providing clear guidance for policymakers on which theory to follow. On a theoretical level, some objections target the concept of technocracy rather than the practical outcomes of technocratic governance. They argue that the usefulness of the concept is limited because it is poorly defined and can denote a wide spectrum of approaches to governance without precise conceptual boundaries.

== History ==
=== Intellectual and cultural developments ===
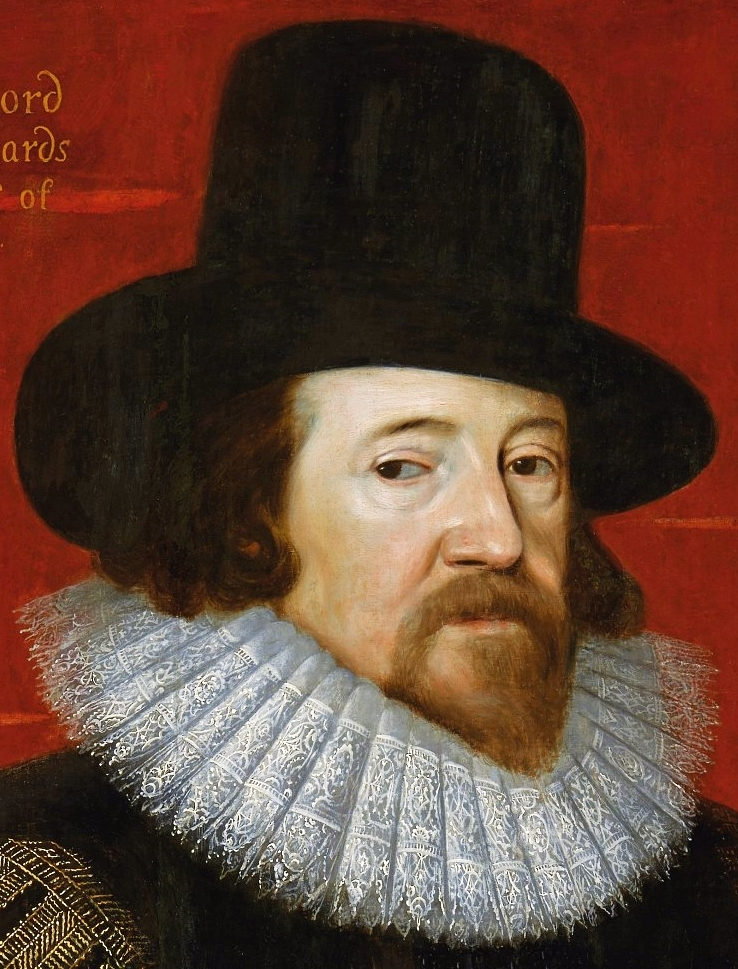
In his book New Atlantis, Francis Bacon envisioned a technocratic utopia ruled by scientists.

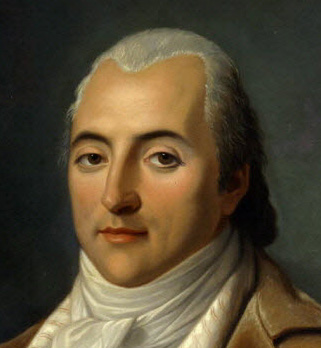
Henri de Saint-Simon is sometimes regarded as the "father of technocracy" due to his idea of a new kind of society based on scientific rationality.

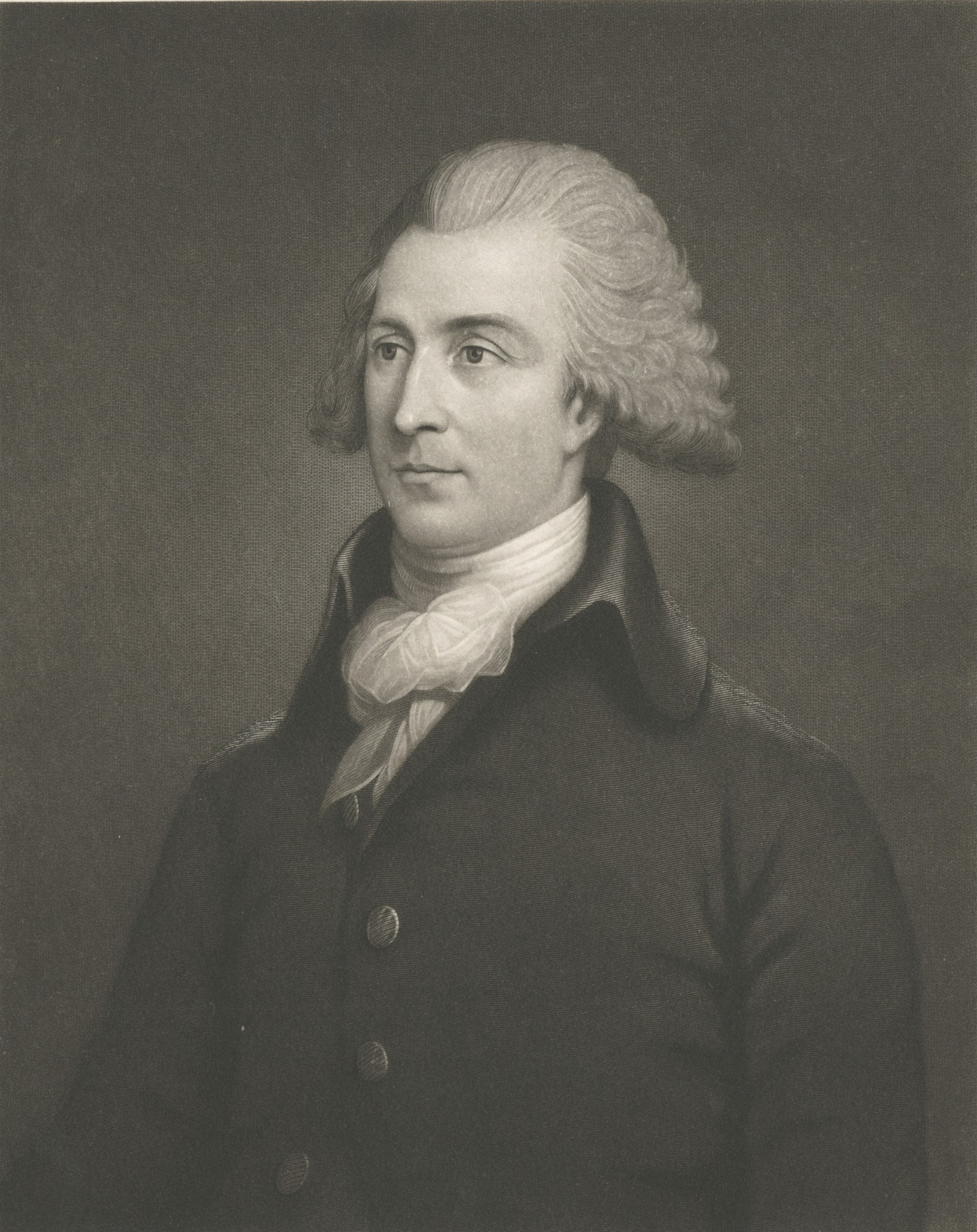
Tench Coxe promoted a technocratic outlook that seeks to solve political problems with machine-based manufacturing.

Some precursors to technocratic thought are found in ancient philosophy. In ancient Greece, Plato (c. 427 – c. 347 BCE) characterized politics as a techne—an art or craft with a specific goal, comparable to other expert practices such as medicine. He argued that political skill and knowledge of human nature are essential to just and prudent leadership. He regarded rule by wise philosopher kings as the ideal form of governance. In ancient China, some technocratic principles are reflected in Confucianism, which arose in the 6th century BCE. They include the elitist view that the most virtuous and capable should rule. Beginning in the 7th century CE, this tradition also saw the emergence of a rigorous, merit-based examination system designed to select the most competent candidates for government service.

In the 16th and 17th centuries, the Scientific Revolution established a new paradigm of rational inquiry in which truth is not passively revealed but actively discovered by following the scientific method and seeking empirical evidence. During the subsequent Age of Enlightenment in the late 17th and 18th centuries, Enlightenment thinkers emphasized reason, science, and technical rationality. They promoted the pursuit of knowledge and challenged traditional authorities, such as religious dogma, absolute monarchy, and inherited social hierarchies. This cultural and intellectual movement shaped the French Revolution, which introduced several technocratic principles into governance. It advanced programs of social engineering and recast political authority around meritocratic expertise. (Note: A further development in France was the establishment of elite schools, the grande écoles, which served to train state administrators, engineers, and scientists, preparing a technocratic elite.) The growing economic complexity during the Industrial Revolution in the late 18th and 19th centuries further accelerated the demand for specialized knowledge and expert-led management.

These developments also influenced political thought. Francis Bacon (1561–1626) envisioned a technocratic utopia in his New Atlantis. Unlike Plato, he argued that empirical scientists, rather than philosopher-kings, should rule. For Bacon, politics should take the form of scientific administration, with scientific elites as benevolent rulers promoting the general interest of the whole. Building on Bacon's vision, Henri de Saint-Simon (1760–1825) conceived a new kind of society based on scientific rationality. He held that a society led by scientists, artists, and industrialists would prosper, with a merit-based hierarchy and an elite class made up of the most educated and productive members of society. Saint-Simon is sometimes regarded as the "father of technocracy". His student Auguste Comte (1798–1857) formulated positivism, arguing that scientific understanding based on empirical evidence is the highest form of knowledge.

Jeremy Bentham's (1748–1832) utilitarianism also influenced technocratic thought, particularly the idea that governance should maximize overall welfare, laying the groundwork for cost–benefit analysis in public administration. Tench Coxe (1755–1824) advanced a technocratic vision that regards machine-driven manufacturing as the main solution to political problems, seeing it as "the means of our political salvation". In his novel Looking Backward, Edward Bellamy (1850–1898) reached a mass audience with his utopian vision of technocracy in which technology is harnessed to ensure abundance, leisure, and peace for all citizens.

Frederick Winslow Taylor (1856–1915) developed and popularized the application of scientific management and efficiency-focused organization to industrial manufacturing and the way workers' tasks were structured and carried out. (Note: Influenced by this approach, Henry Ford (1863–1947) translated scientific management into standardized mass production using assembly lines.) Henry Gantt (1861–1919), an associate of Taylor, sought to extend these ideas into the political realm. He proposed a "new democracy" that grounds governance in scientific facts. For him, the degree of an individual's political authority should correspond to their ability and willingness to advance the common good. His outlook was also influenced by Thorstein Veblen (1857–1929), who criticized capitalism for introducing conflicts of interest that hinder the public good. For example, Veblen held that the goal of maximizing profits can result in attempts to increase prices by artificially lowering industrial output. He argued that a system run by engineers and technicians could better serve common prosperity.

Max Weber (1864–1920) explored the role of instrumental rationality in modern society. He argued that the pervasiveness of scientific and technical reason is a key feature of modernity, emphasizing the importance of mathematical and scientific knowledge and the increasing reliance on trained experts and managers to organize social life.

During the two World Wars, technocratic principles were implemented to gain military and economic advantages by increasing productivity and efficiency. This happened in several fields, including the weapons industry, logistics, and mobilization of the workforce.

In the book The Managerial Revolution, James Burnham (1905–1987) grounded technocratic principles in a sociological analysis of the growing role of managers and technical experts in modern industrial societies. John Kenneth Galbraith (1908–2006) further explored these ideas in his book The New Industrial State, arguing that advanced technology requires large corporations, long-term planning, and an extensive network of technical experts. In the book The Coming of Post-Industrial Society, Daniel Bell (1919–2011) shifted the focus from industrial to post-industrial society. He highlighted the importance of technocratic principles as knowledge, science, and information technologies become the primary drivers of economic growth. Jacques Ellul (1912–1994) investigated the growing reliance on technological and efficiency-oriented processes from a critical perspective. He argued that it acts as an autonomous, impersonal force that threatens democracy.

Postmodern thinkers examined the increasing centrality of expert knowledge in modern society. Michel Foucault (1926–1984) explored how knowledge is used to wield power over populations through indirect mechanisms embedded in correctional, medical, and educational institutions, such as surveillance and responses to deviant behavior. Jean-François Lyotard (1924–1998) warned of the totalizing and dehumanizing tendencies of technocratic rationality. A different criticism was formulated by the Frankfurt School theorist Jürgen Habermas (1929–2026), who regarded technocracy as a threat to democracy. He proposed that expert knowledge should be integrated into democratic processes without replacing them, emphasizing the role of communication and public deliberation.

=== In different regions ===
Symbol of Technocracy Inc.

In the 20th century, technocratic ideas influenced political developments in many regions. In the 1930s, the technocracy movement emerged in the United States and Canada from the Technical Alliance, which had been founded in 1919 by Howard Scott (1890–1970). Followers of the technocracy movement applied Veblen's ideas to the Great Depression—a deep economic crisis that had started in 1929. They argued that this crisis was a symptom of capitalism and proposed a technocratic reorganization of society to overcome it. In addition to the political governance by engineers, scientists, and technical managers, this program aimed to replace the price-based economy with one that organizes distribution and consumption based on energy costs. It sought to increase abundance while reducing average workload through centralized planning, integrating North America into a self-sufficient unit called a technate. (Note: The movement later split into two rival groups, the Continental Committee on Technocracy led by Harold Loeb and Technocracy Inc. led by Scott, and the movement's influence declined in the following years.) In the post–World War II decades, technocracy influenced U.S. politics by shaping institutional frameworks, particularly in economic and military spheres. Links to politics happened through regulatory and advisory bodies such as the Atomic Energy Commission, the National Science Foundation, the Council of Economic Advisers, and the RAND Corporation.

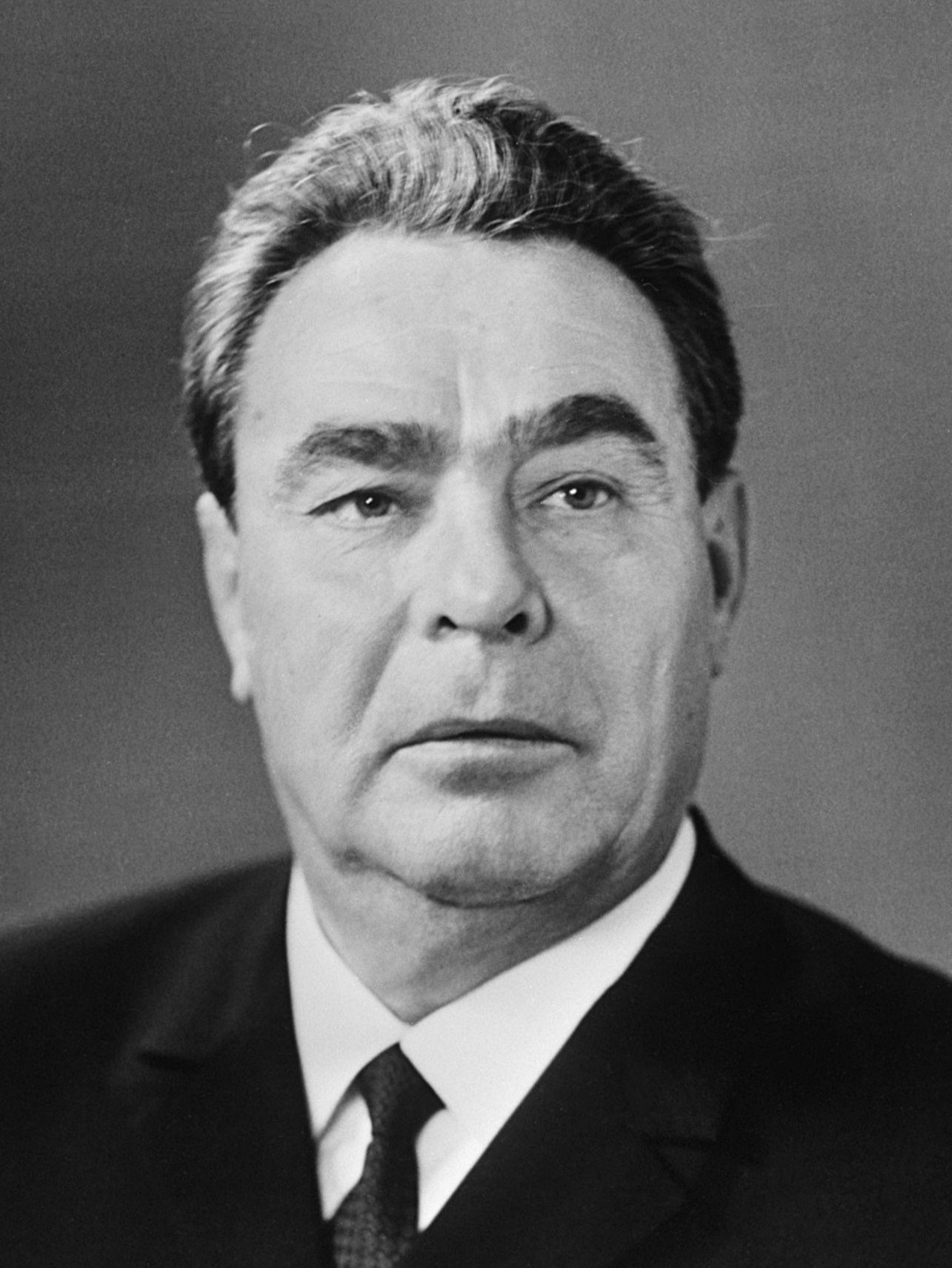
The Soviet Union exhibited several features of technocratic governance, particularly during the leadership of Leonid Brezhnev.

Various aspects of technocratic governance were present in the Soviet Union, such as the centralized economic planning by experts under the State Planning Committee, established in 1921. These tendencies were particularly prominent during the leadership of Leonid Brezhnev (1906–1982), who promoted a scientific-technological revolution with an increased reliance on engineers as political leaders.

Early roots of Chinese technocracy are found in the 1950s and 1960s when elite universities trained engineers for political and administrative roles. This trend saw a significant backlash during the Cultural Revolution (1966–1976), marked by anti-elitism and anti-intellectualism. Since the late 1970s, the technocratic influence has been restored and expanded, as many of the engineers trained decades earlier rose to political power, with leadership often characterized by a synthesis of technical expertise and socialist ideology.

Technocratic tendencies were prominent in Latin America during the 1960s and 1970s, both in democratic and authoritarian regimes. They typically took the form of state-led development efforts in sectors such as agriculture, industry, and health, such as the expert-guided reforms in Colombia under the National Front governments. In subsequent decades, the technocratic agenda in Latin America increasingly centered on the economy.

During the 1970s and 1980s, Singapore saw the establishment of an administrative state focused on rational organization, technical skill, and meritocratic egalitarianism while seeking to avoid ideological polarization and partisan interests. Because of its economic success in the form of rapid development and growth, it is often regarded as a leading exemplar of the advantages of technocracy. Other Asian examples of the implementation of technocratic principles are found in Taiwan, South Korea, and Japan.

Beginning in the second half of the 20th century, the formation of the European Union introduced various forms of technocratic governance, such as the establishment of expert-led institutions with little democratic control, including the European Central Bank. Starting in the 1990s, evidence-based policy-making has become an influential approach in the United Kingdom, seeking to align governance with robust empirical evidence and rigorous scientific evaluation. In the 2000s and 2010s, several EU countries adopted technocratic measures in response to political or economic turmoil, such as technocratic cabinets in Italy and Greece during the European financial crisis.

== See also ==
- Bright green environmentalism – Stance favoring the convergence of technological change with environmentalism
- Effective altruism – Philosophical and social movement
- Player Piano – First novel published by Kurt Vonnegut in 1952
- Post-politics – Critique of post-Cold War politics of consensus
- Post-scarcity economy – Situation in which most goods are available to everyone at little or no cost
- Project Cybersyn – Chilean 1971–73 economic management project
- Redressement Français – French anti-parliamentarian political movement
- Scientocracy – System of government
