= John Sandgren =

- Born: 1883; Roslagen, Sweden
- Died: October 17, 1932 (aged 48–49); Chicago, USA

John (Johan) Sandgren (1883, Roslagen – 17 October 1932, Chicago) was a Swedish syndicalist active in Sweden and the United States. He was editor of The One Big Union Monthly and The Industrial Pioneer, publications of the Industrial Workers of the World.

In 1909 he visited the USA on behalf of the 1909 Swedish general strike.

During the 1920s he supported himself through working for a translation agency which he had established.

== Works ==
Translations:

- Varför jag är syndikalist (Why I am A Syndicalist) by Tom Mann translated into Swedish
- The IWW Needs an Industrial Encyclopedia, The One Big Union Monthly, November 1919 pp. 42–44
