= Technical Alliance =

American anti-waste group (1919–1921)

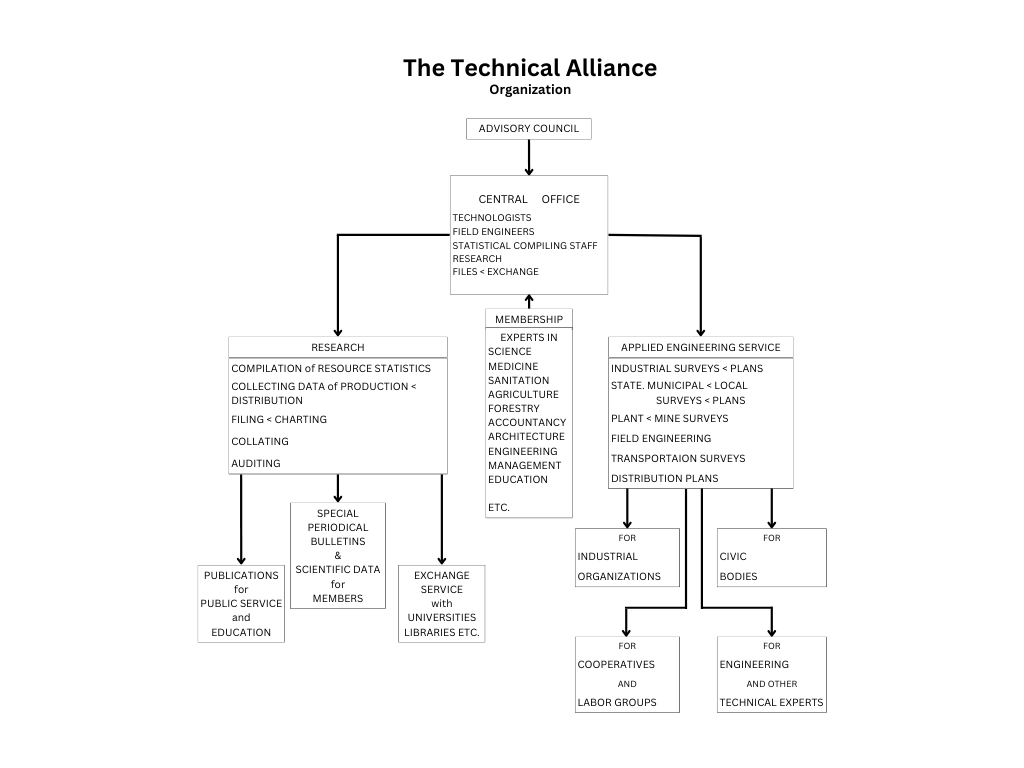
Technical Alliance Organization Chart

The Technical Alliance was a group of engineers, scientists, and technicians based in New York City, formed towards the end of 1919 by American researcher Howard Scott. The Alliance started an Energy Survey of North America, intended to document the wastefulness of the capitalist system.

The Technical Alliance advocated a more rational and productive society directed by technical experts, but their survey work failed to have a significant effect. Although some waste was documented, the "prosperity and conservatism of the 1920s undermined the political orientation of the Technical Alliance", and it disbanded in 1921. The energy survey was not completed.

== Members ==
The Technical Alliance was by no means a mass organization, but it did have some notable members and technical experts. Apart from Scott, other members of the Technical Alliance included:

- Frederick L. Ackerman
- Carl C. Alsberg
- Alice Barrows
- Allen Carpenter
- Stuart Chase
- L.K. Comstock
- Bassett Jones
- Robert H. Kohn
- Benton MacKaye
- Leland Olds
- Charles P. Steinmetz
- Richard C. Tolman
- John C. Vaughan
- Thorstein Veblen
- Charles H. Whitaker

== Energy Survey of North America ==
After the disbanding of The Technical Alliance, Howard Scott remained in Greenwich Village spending the decade of 1920-1930 explaining the need of energy as a basis for distributing goods to anyone willing to listen. And his friends tried multiple times to setup Scott in a office to continue The Technical Alliance's goals. All attempts failed until Howard Scott met Marion King Hubbert who was impressed with Scott's work. Hubbert paid Scott's rent, and the two moved in together with plans to start something new like The Technical Alliance. Two original members of the old Technical Alliance joined Scott and Hubbert; Bassett Jones, and Frederick Ackerman. Professor Walter Rautenstrauch became interested in the group, saying that what Scott accomplished "was more exhaustive than anything ever before attempted." Ackerman convinced the Architect's Emergency Relief Committee to employ 25-30 unemployed draftsmen to aid in research.

April 1931, the Energy Survey of North America was officially continued at Columbia University, using vacant rooms. Soon calling the group "Technocracy". Additional people who joined the group were Dal Hitchcock who had some engineering experience, and Leon Henderson who was a part of the Russell Sage Foundation at the time.

The goal of the Energy Survey was:

To plot on charts the industrial and agricultural development of the United States during the past one hundred years in terms of employment, production, and energy expended.

Approximately 200 commodities were studied and charted before the project was stopped in January 1933. But the group intended to research 3,000 commodities. The research was never fully released to the public, only some charts and formulas were printed for Prof. Rautenstrauch's speeches, and some of the findings formed the basis of the book Debt and Production, by Bassett Jones.

Stuart Chase looked into around 30 of the charts, one-two of the sources, believing the research followed the expected tendencies of industrial development.

The first publicity the Energy Survey research received was a story from The New York Times, published in June 1932, and in a speech before the uptown branch of the American Statistical Association, where Scott discussed some conclusions of the Energy Survey. By early August, the Times reported:

Hundreds of letters from other research bodies, from universities, economists, labor organizations and civic leaders asking for further details

Howard Scott gave an interview on the 21st of August at Columbia University, to the Times and Tribune, marking the first widespread publicity on Technocracy. In the next few months, Technocracy blew up in publicity, eventually leading to Scott's academic credentials getting questioned as a engineer who's been educated in Europe with 3-4 college degrees, then being disgraced he was removed from Columbia University in 1933. And co-founded Technocracy Incorporated with M. King Hubbert.

== Sources ==
- Burris, Beverly H. (1993). Technocracy at Work. Albany: State University of New York Press. ISBN 978-0-7914-1496-5.
- Segal, Howard P. (2005). Technological Utopianism in American Culture (20th anniversary ed.). Syracuse: Syracuse University Press. ISBN 978-0-8156-3061-6.
- Akin, William E. (1977). Technocracy and the American Dream: The Technocrat Movement, 1900-1941. Berkeley: University of California Press. ISBN 978-0-520-03110-4.
