= Bureau of Industrial Research =

Early 20th-century, pro-labor, American research group

- Founder: Industrial Workers of the World
- Purpose: "to promote sound human relationships in industry by consultation, fact studies and publicity"
- Headquarters: 289 Fourth Avenue
- Location: New York, USA

The Bureau of Industrial Research was a New York City-based labor research organization.

== History ==
In 1920, the Industrial Workers of the World (IWW) created the Bureau of Industrial Research to address such issues, in part due to the influence of the technocratic ideas of Howard Scott. In 1921, a series of articles by or about the Bureau appeared in the Industrial Pioneer.

== Description ==
The group described itself as an organization "to promote sound human relationships in industry by consultation, fact studies and publicity." Its Manhattan offices had a library on current industrial relations. It offered to supply data "at moderate cost" to interested parties, whether individuals, corporations, labor organizations, or the press.

== Members ==
In 1921, its members included:

- Robert W. Bruère (director)
- Herbert Croly (treasurer)
- Heber Blankenhorn
- Mary D. Blankenhorn
- Arthur Gleason
- Leonard Outhwaite
- Ordway Tead
- Savel Zimand

== Publications ==
- How the Government Handled Its Labor Problems During the War (1919)
- Industrial Council Plan in Great Britain (1919)
- Report on the Steel Strike of 1919 (1919)
- Workers' Education (1921)
- Public Opinion and the Steel Strike (1921)
- National Council for the Printing Trades (1921)
- Modern Social Movements (1921)
- In Non-Union Mines (1922)
- Open Shop Drive; Who is Behind it and Where is it Going? (1921)
- Strike for Union (1924)
- Anthracite Question (1924)

== See also ==
- Industrial Workers of the World
- Labor Research Association
