= The Engineers and the Price System =

1921 book on economics proposing technocracy

- Author: Thorstein Veblen
- Language: English
- Subject: Economics, Political economy
- Published: 1921
- Publisher: B. W. Huebsch
- Publication place: United States

The Engineers and the Price System, by Thorstein Veblen, is a compilation of a series of papers originally published in The Dial in 1921, each of which mainly analyzes and criticizes the price system, planned obsolescence, and artificial scarcity. The final chapter outlined a plan for a "soviet of technicians", which he emphasized was very far from being politically possible at the time. The book, along with other works of Veblen, became influential in the formation of the technocracy movement in the 1930s.

== See also ==
- Veblen good
