= Howard Scott (engineer) =

American engineer (1890–1970)

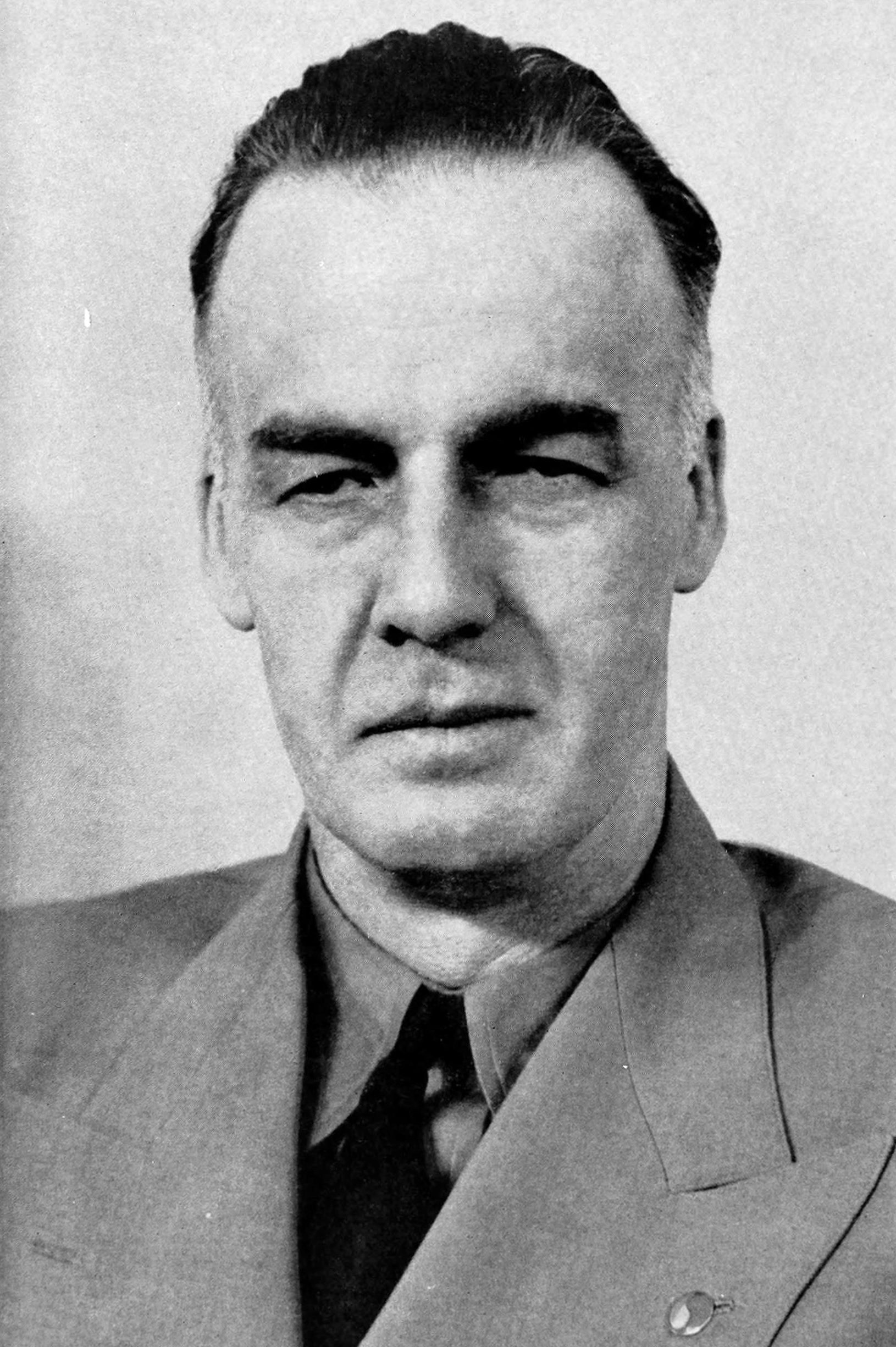
- Scott c. 1942
- Born: April 1, 1890; Virginia, U.S.
- Died: January 1, 1970 (aged 79); Orlando, Florida, U.S.
- Occupation: Engineer
- Spouse: Eleanor Steele
- Howard Scott's voice

Signature
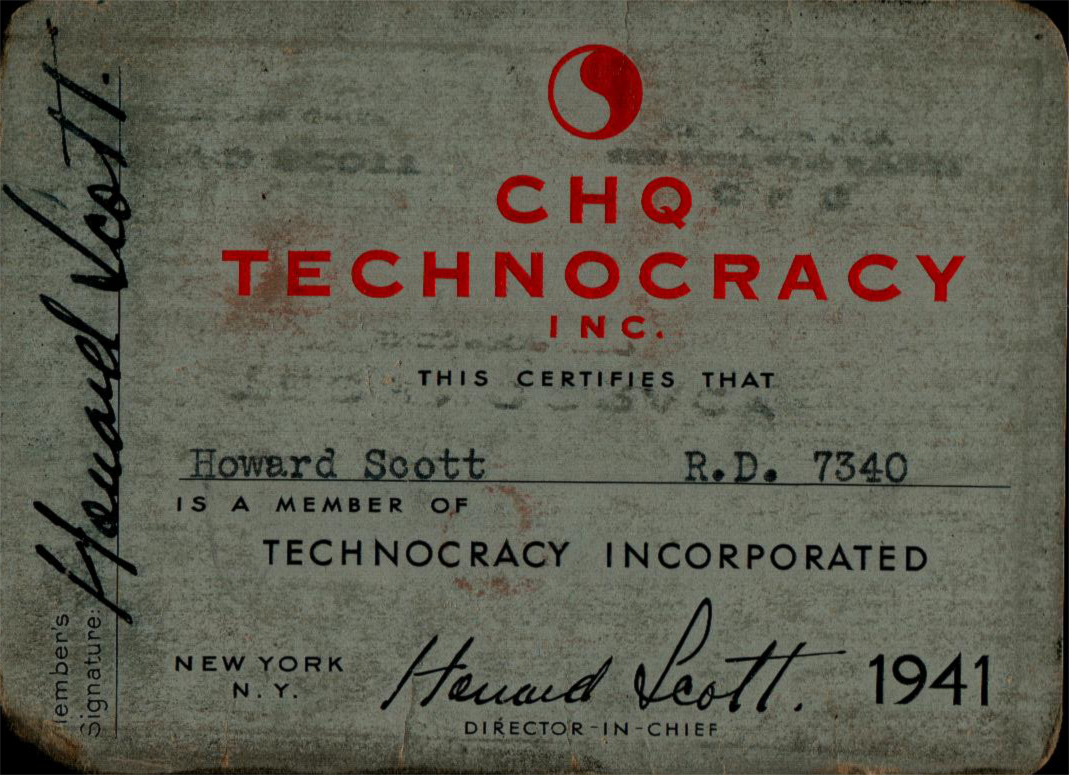

Howard Scott (April 1, 1890 – January 1, 1970) was an American researcher and founder of the philosophy of Technocracy. He formed the Technical Alliance and Technocracy Incorporated.

== Early life ==
Little is known about Scott's early life and he has been described as a "mysterious young man". He was born in Virginia in 1890 and was of Scottish-Irish ancestry. He claimed to have been educated in Europe, but his training did not include any formal higher education.

In 1918, soon before the end of the First World War, Scott appeared in New York City. Scott worked in various construction camps, where he acquired some engineering experience, and in 1918 was working with a cement pouring group at Muscle Shoals. After this, Scott established himself in Greenwich Village as "a kind of Bohemian engineer". Scott also managed a small business named Duron Chemical Company which made paint and floor polish at Pompton Lakes, New Jersey. Scott's job was to deliver his goods and show his customers how to use the floor polishing material.

Margaret Mead and her friend Eleanor Steele became close friends with Howard Scott. After graduating from college, Steele fell in love with Scott. Mead and Steele found that people often made up stories about Scott. At that time both Mead and Steele were under the assumption that Scott was already married.

In any event, we believed that Howard had a wife, and he did have a mistress, an actress whom we saw perform in a magnificent prevention of King Lear, and then there was Eleanor.

Mead described Scott as:

He was an extraordinary person, well over six feet in height, gaunt and rangy, Irish and somehow a man of the frontier, endlessly inventive and prophetic. And very honest.

When Scott was just forming Technocracy, he had long conversations with Mead, expanding her understanding of automation. After the Hotel Pierre address, Scott later told Mead:

Howard explained to me that he knew the kind of society he advocated could not come into being yet. There would have to be experiments by the Left and experiments by the Right before people would give up the idea of an economy based on scarcity and recognize that with modern techniques of production the thing to do was to organize consumption.

December, 1933, when Scott was away on an organization trip. Eleanor became fatally ill. And when Scott addressed a mass meeting in Chicago, she was buried, Scott got back the day after her funeral. Once back, Mead and Scott spent the entire afternoon walking and talking, he made a comment about Eleanor that "She was the Joan of Arc of Technocracy". Mead further explains more about Scott:

At the height of his notoriety, Howard was attacked as an imposter who made all sorts of false claims about his activities and his training. In fact, he had only completed the ninth grade, but his prevision of the electronic revolution was extraordinary. His lack of mastery of the intermediate steps was one of his great handicaps and perhaps also the very vividness of his accounts of people he had never met, places he had never seen, and dams he had not built. Events that lived in his imagination became real to others, and later those who sought to destroy him accused of fabrication. But he was not destroyed as a person, for he lived to a ripe old age, sustained by the faith of a few people. Had his education matched the scope of his imagination, would he, I have often wondered, have had a profound effect on the country, or was he a forerunner, a man born before his time?

== Influence on the I.W.W. ==
At the end of World War I, Howard Scott helped to form the Technical Alliance which studied economic and social trends in North America; the Technical Alliance disbanded in 1921.

Scott was queried by a few men seeking for research to be done; it's unknown who exactly suggested Scott to them. But when he first did their research it was about copper consumption for a potential copper industry strike, and Scott wasn't aware at first that the men who hired him were officials of the Industrial Workers of the World, or that the research was intended for a strike, though he learned of it eventually.

According to Ralph Chaplin he met Scott in Greenwich Village and was invited to his studio. Chaplin and Scott discussed the improvement of the I.W.W to better help a worker revolution and Scott was said to have made some impressive statements, insisting that the revolutionary force will be with engineers. They also talked about Thorstein Veblen's Soviet of Engineers. Scott was dissatisfied with Veblen's use of the word 'Soviet'. Chaplin spoke of the IWW's need to have organized information. Scott suggested an Industrial Research Bureau explaining the importance of having all the data for an informed decision.

Chaplin wrote: "That idea appealed to me at once. After all, the engineer was included in our revised "One Big Union" chart. But I resented the bohemian atmosphere in which Scott seemed to thrive. All the time he was discoursing so plausibly about teardrop automobiles, flying wing airplanes, and technological unemployment, I was looking at the other side of the studio where an appalling phallic watercolor painting was displayed among blueprints and graphs on a big easel. Evidently the "Great Scott" was a man of diversified interests."

In correspondence between Assistant Professor of Economics J. Kaye Faulkner and Howard Scott, Prof. Faulkner questioned Scott's and Chaplin's interactions, mentioning Chaplin's book "Wobbly, the rough-and-tumble story of an American radical" To which Scott denied having talked to Chaplin for very long, or to having a phallic painting. As Scott puts it — "I never had a painting, phallic or otherwise, and if I had had a painting I certainly would not mix it up with blue prints and mathematical charts."

In 1920 during an IWW convention (it's unknown if Scott attended), the IWW created an official Bureau of Industrial Research, and the same year they hired Howard Scott as a research director. This allowed for Scott to have greater influence in spreading his ideas concerning technocracy, as in a few of the One Big Union Monthly papers he authored some segments using the name "An Industrial Engineer", criticizing the union for its lack of technological perspective and for its faith in Marxian analysis.

After 1921 the Bureau of Industrial Research became inactive, and was soon replaced. However, Howard Scott became chief advocate of technocracy in North America.

== Technocracy Movement ==
=== Origins ===
Technocracy Inc. formed in 1931 to promote the ideas of Howard Scott. Scott considered government and industry as wasteful and unfair and believed that an economy managed by engineers would be efficient and equitable. He advocated for the "price system" and fiat currencies to be replaced with a system based on the amount of energy needed to produce specific goods. Scott also advocated for engineers to manage a continental government, which he termed a technate, to "optimize the use of energy to assure abundance".

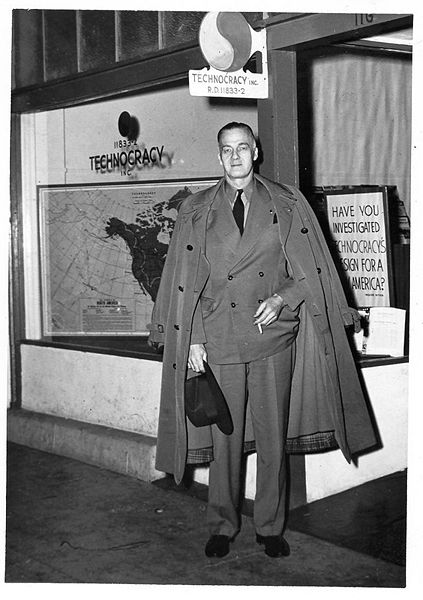
Scott in front of Technocracy Inc. Section house RD-11833-2 SHQ in 1942

Scott, together with Walter Rautenstrauch formed the Committee on Technocracy in 1932, which advocated a more rational and productive society directed by technical experts. The Committee disbanded in January 1933, after only a few months, largely because of different opinions possessed by Scott and Rautenstrauch and widespread criticism of Scott. Scott had "overstated his academic credentials", and he was discovered not to be a "distinguished engineer".

=== Growth into a major movement ===
M. King Hubbert had joined the staff of Columbia University in 1931 and met Howard Scott. Hubbert and Scott co-founded Technocracy Incorporated in 1933, with Scott as chief engineer and Hubbert as secretary. Scott remained as the chief engineer of Technocracy Incorporated until his death in 1970. Scott "argued indefatigably that scientific analysis of industrial production would show the path to lasting efficiency and unprecedented abundance". Scott gained many devotees. M. King Hubbert, for example, considered Scott extremely knowledgeable in physics. There was some discontent with Scott's management during World War 2, and a number of technocrats quit Technocracy Inc. and established their own organization which lasted for about a year. Virtually unknown now, the organization had more than half a million members in California alone at its time of greatest popularity during the 1930s and 1940s.

On January 13, 1933, Scott gave a speech about technocracy at New York's Hotel Pierre, before a live audience of 400 people, which was also broadcast by radio nationwide. The speech was termed a "grave mistake", "disastrous", and "a complete failure", as Scott probably had no experience or training as a public speaker.

=== Decline and legacy ===
In 1941, as fascism gained ground overseas, Technocracy flooded the US with advertisements featuring identical gray cars and uniforms, leading people to the impression that Technocracy had started to shift into a form of fascism. Margaret Mead attempted to find out why Scott had invoked these kinds of associations. When Mead and Scott talked over dinner she concluded:

There was no sinister millionaire behind the movement and its goals were unchanged. The members of the organization had put their combined savings into that one set of huge advertisements in the hope of attracting a larger following. But very few people responded.

While a major leader of the Technocracy movement in Canada, Joshua Haldeman, was the grandfather of technology mogul Elon Musk, Ira Basen, producer of the CBC Radio documentary Welcome to the Technate, asserts that Howard Scott would not have liked Musk because Musk is a capitalist, not a Technocrat.

== Death ==
Scott died at the age of 79 on January 1, 1970. He never trained a successor. In July 1987 the Akron Ohio chapter of Technocracy Inc. compiled and published all of the spoken events of Scott that they could find into a book. It reached a page count of 2030, and was titled; The Words and Wisdom of Howard Scott. Part of the intro-page reads;

Was he a visionary or a man of great perception? Or was he a man with an analytical brain, able to see things as they were, not as people would like them to be, or more to the point, hoped they would be? He was a man of great integrity, refusing all kinds of financial inducement to set up a harmless research foundation which would have made him rich, but would have betrayed his principles. He was concerned with the practical problems of running and organizing a modern technological society; to this end he devoted his life. Events have borne out the correctness of his analysis; the predictions of Technocracy have all proved to be accurate. Whether we as a society have the wit to take advantage of these findings remains to be seen.

Technocrats who have met Scott, still hold great respect for him. From the 2021 CBC documentary Welcome to the Technate; an elder technocrat, Edward Blechsmidt had this to say about meeting Scott;

He lived in a farmhouse in Rushland, PA, which was their headquarters. And he would hold court in the evening over dinner. And we'd have long—long discussions on how technocracy could be implemented, and how a technate would work. And the guy was a brilliant man, he could come out and spout out all kinds of bad things that were happening and shouldn't-that don't need to happen, in North America and around the world. He was on a different plane than regular people, you know what I'm saying? He would talk and explain things, and smile and be friendly. But if you ask him a question, he immediately would spout off a 20-minutes of a, something you couldn't even understand.
