= Savel Zimand =

Savel Zimand (May 14, 1891, Iasi, Romania–1967) was a health educator, and journalist. From 1909 to 1912 he studied in Berlin, Germany attending the Friedrich Wilhelm University of Berlin 's Seminar of Oriental Languages and the Höhere Webeschule, a technical college.He left for the United States of America in 1913. He was a visiting lecturer at Yale University and occasionally lectured at Harvard and Columbia universities.

His father was Morris Zimand and his mother Marie Kauffman Zimand. He became a naturalised US citizen in 1919 In 1926 he married Gertrude Folks, the daughter of Homer Folks, who worked for the National Child Labor Committee at the time.

He wrote a number of articles for The New York Times including interviews with Leon Trotsky, Mahatma Gandhi and Nadezhda Krupskaya.

He died in the Columbus_Hospital, New York in December 1967.

== Selected publications ==
- 1921 Modern Social Movements
- 1926 State Capitalism in Russia: The Soviet Economic System in Operation, 1917-1926
- 1928 Living India
- 1940 Your Health Center
