= Scientocracy =

System of government

Scientocracy is the practice of basing public policies on science.

== Discourse ==
Peter A. Ubel, an American physician, is a proponent of scientocracy. In an article titled "Scientocracy: Policy making that reflects human nature", he writes, "When I talk about Scientocracy, then, I'm not talking about a world ruled by behavioral scientists, or any other kind of scientists. Instead, I am imagining a government of the people, but informed by scientists. A world where people don't argue endlessly about whether educational vouchers will improve schools, whether gun control will reduce crime, or whether health savings accounts can lower health care expenditures,... but one instead where science has a chance to show us whether vouchers, gun control laws, and health savings accounts work and, if so, under what conditions."

Deepak Kumar, a historian, has written about the "Emergence of 'Scientocracy'" in India.

== Earlier use ==
Florence Caddy (1837–1923) wrote a book titled Through the fields with Linnaeus: a chapter in Swedish history. That book was published in two volumes in 1887. In volume 1 she wrote, "His lesson in Hamburg had taught him that a novus homo must not be arrogant when he enters the society of the scientocracy, and that he must not run himself rashly against vested interests. Yet for all his poverty, Carl Linnaeus seems to have lived in intimacy with the scientocrats of Leyden—Van Royen, Van Swieten, Lieberkuhn, Lawson, and Gronovius." In these two sentences she uses "society of the scientocracy" and "scientocrats" to refer to groups of eminent scientists of that time.

In 1933, Hugo Gernsback defined scientocracy as "the direction of the country and its resources by Scientists and not by Technicians".

== See also ==
- Evidence-based policy
- Oligarchy
- Scientific consensus
- Scientific management
- Scientism
- Scientific socialism
- Technocracy
