= Walter Rautenstrauch =

American engineer (1880–1951)

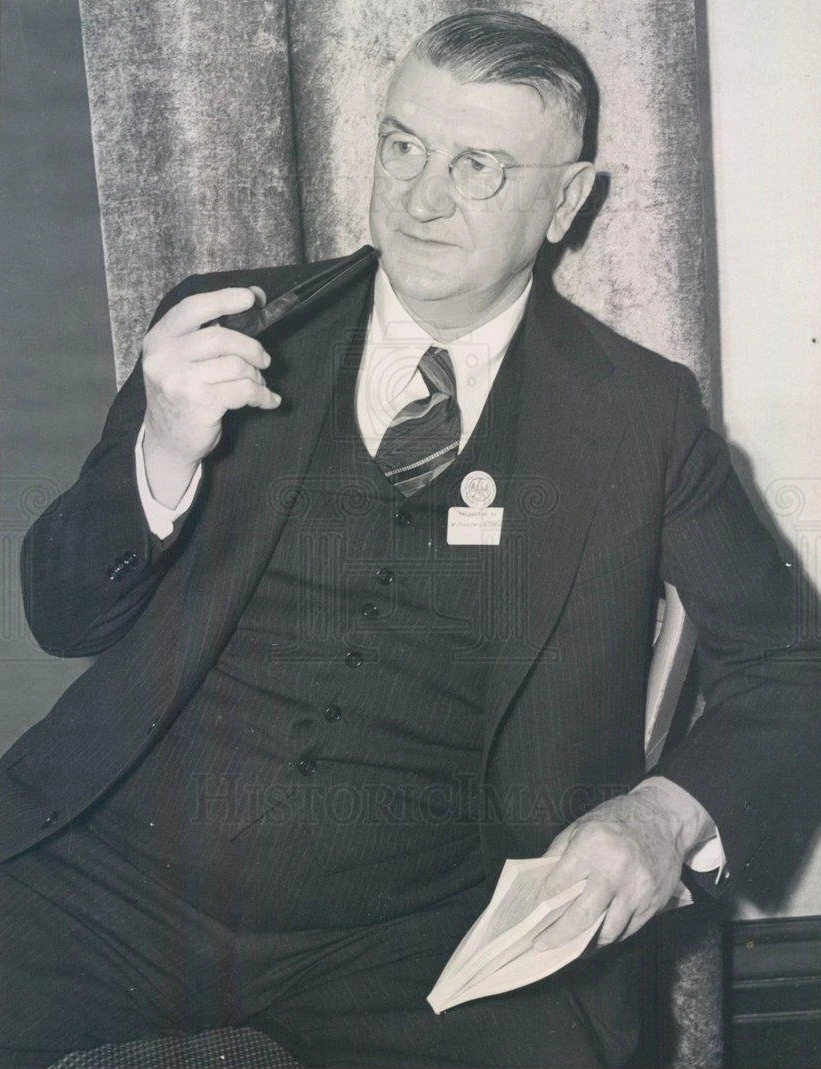
- Rautenstrauch in 1940
- Born: 1880
- Died: January 3, 1951 (aged 70–71)
- Occupations: Mechanical and consulting engineer and professor

Walter Rautenstrauch (1880–1951) was an American mechanical and consulting engineer, and Professor at Columbia University's Department of Industrial Engineering in the 1930s. He coined the term break-even point, and developing the break-even chart together with Charles Edward Knoeppel.

Rautenstrauch was instrumental in the creation of Columbia University's Department of Industrial Engineering, which is said to be the first such department in the United States. One of his most important students and colleagues was Seymour Melman, who went on to be a professor in this department.

Rautenstrauch, together with Howard Scott, formed the Committee on Technocracy in 1932, which advocated a more rational and productive society headed by technical experts. However, Rautenstrauch and Scott soon found they held very different views. Scott advocated for complete control of society and the government by Engineers. Rautenstrauch was more moderate, wishing for Engineers to only be in charge of industrial and economic decisions and the government to maintain some level of democracy. Rautenstrauch also stressed the need for human and moral values. In 1933 the Committee disbanded, largely because of different views held by the two men.

Partially due to his involvement in Technocracy (despite his break up with the increasingly erratic Scott) and partially due to his other political views, Rautenstrauch gained animosity from more conservative staff members at Columbia up to his retirement in 1943. Despite this, he was remembered by most students as a "caring and insightful teacher".

Rautenstrauch remained active even after his retirement. He helped raise funds for refugees during World War II. He actively defended Edward Condon after the Condon was investigated by the House Un-American Activities Committee. Rautenstrauch also worked for the Progressive Party in the 1948 Presidential Election. He contributed to scientific journals and authored books on engineering up until his death. He died at the Lenox Hill Hospital on January 3, 1951. He was 70 years old.
