= Cyberocracy =

Form of government that rules by the use of information

In futurology, cyberocracy describes a hypothetical form of government that rules by the effective use of information. The exact nature of a cyberocracy is largely speculative as, apart from Project Cybersyn, there have been no cybercratic governments; however, a growing number of cybercratic elements can be found in many developed nations. Cyberocracy theory is largely the work of David Ronfeldt, who published several papers on the theory. Some sources equate cyberocracy with algorithmic governance, although algorithms are not the only means of processing information.

== Overview ==
Cyberocracy, from the roots 'cyber-' and '-cracy' signifies rule by way of information, especially when using interconnected computer networks. The concept involves information and its control as the source of power and is viewed as the next stage of the political evolution.

The fundamental feature of a cyberocracy would be the rapid transmission of relevant information from the source of a problem to the people in a position able to fix said problem, most likely via a system of interconnected computer networks and automated information sorting software, with human decision makers only being called into use in the case of unusual problems, problem trends, or through an appeal process pursued by an individual. Cyberocracy is the functional antithesis of traditional bureaucracies which sometimes notoriously suffer from fiefdom, slowness, and a list of other unfortunate qualities. A bureaucracy forces and limits the flow of information through defined channels that connect discrete points while cyberocracy transmits volumes of information accessible to many different parties. In addition, bureaucracy deploys brittle practices such as programs and budgets whereas cyberocracy is more adaptive with its focus on management and cultural contexts. Ultimately a cyberocracy may use administrative AIs if not an AI as head of state forming a machine rule government.

According to Ronfeldt and Valda, it is still too early to determine the exact form of cyberocracy but that it could lead to new forms of the traditional systems of governance such as democracy, totalitarianism, and hybrid governments. Some noted that cyberocracy is still speculative since there is currently no existing cybercratic government, although it is acknowledged that some of its components are already adopted by governments in a number of developed countries.

While the outcome or the results of cyberocracy is still challenging to identify, there are those who cite that it will lead to new forms of governmental and political systems, particularly amid the emergence of new sensory apparatuses, networked society, and modes of networked governance.
