= The One Big Union Monthly =

- Editor: John Sandgren
- Frequency: Monthly
- Publisher: Industrial Workers of the World
- First issue: First Series: March 1919; Second Series: January 1937
- Final issue: First Series: January 1921; Second Series June: 1938
- Country: United States
- Based in: Chicago

The One Big Union Monthly was a monthly publication of the General Executive Board of the Industrial Workers of the World (IWW). The first series ran from March 1919 to January 1921. The second series ran from January 1937 to June 1938.

== First series ==
In the first issue the editor promised to produce a regular monthly magazine of 64 pages, half dealing with reports from within the IWW and half consisting literary contributions, cartoons and other illustrations. Whereas pure news items would be handled by the IWW's weekly press the OBU Monthly aimed to summarise and interpret such news from across the world. The magazine was offered for sale at 15¢, with an annual subscription of $1.50. The first issue included a piece In Memoriam Carl Liebknecht by Covington Ami.
