= Deleveraging =

Reduction of the ratio of debt to equity

At the micro-economic level, deleveraging refers to the reduction of the leverage ratio, or the percentage of debt in the balance sheet of a single economic entity, such as a household or a firm. It is the opposite of leveraging, which is the practice of borrowing money to acquire assets and multiply gains and losses.

At the macro-economic level, deleveraging of an economy refers to the simultaneous reduction of debt levels in multiple sectors, including private sectors and the government sector. It is usually measured as a decline of the total debt to GDP ratio in the national accounts. The deleveraging of an economy following a financial crisis has significant macro-economic consequences and is often associated with severe recessions.

== In microeconomics ==
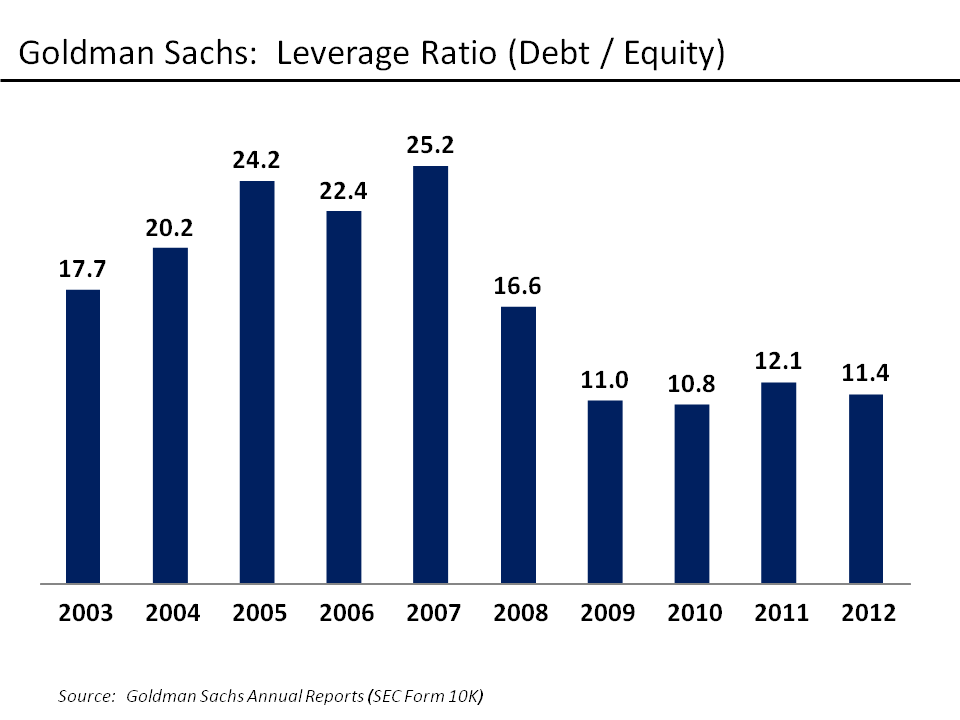
The leverage ratio, measured as debt divided by equity, for investment bank Goldman Sachs from 2003–2012. The lower the ratio, the greater the ability of the firm to withstand losses.

While leverage allows a borrower to acquire assets and multiply gains in good times, it also leads to multiple losses in bad times. During a market downturn when the value of assets and income plummets, a highly leveraged borrower faces heavy losses due to his or her obligation to the service of high levels of debt. If the value of assets falls below the value of debt, the borrower then has a high risk to default. Deleveraging reduces the total amplification of market volatility on the borrower's balance sheet. It means giving up potential gains in good times, in exchange for lower risk of heavy loss and nasty default in bad times.

However, precaution is not the most common reason for deleveraging. Deleveraging usually happens after a market downturn and hence is driven by the need to cover loss, which can deplete capital, build a less risky profile, or is required by nervous lenders to prevent default. In the last case, lenders lower the leverage offered by asking for a higher level of collateral and down payment. It is estimated that from 2006 to 2008, the average down payment required for a home buyer in the US increased from 5% to 25%, a decrease of leverage from 20 to 4.

To deleverage, one needs to raise cash to pay debt, either from raising capital or selling assets or both. A bank, for example, can cut expenditure, sell liquid assets, absorb off-balance-sheet structured investment vehicles and conduits, or allow its illiquid assets to run off at maturity, which, however, can take a long time.

Deleveraging is frustrating and painful for private sector entities in distress: selling assets at a discount can itself lead to heavy losses. In addition, dysfunctional security and credit markets make it difficult to raise capital from public market. Private capital market is often no easier: equity holders usually have already incurred heavy losses themselves, bank/firm share prices have fallen substantially and are expected to fall further, and the market expects the crisis to last for a considerable length of time. These factors can all contribute to hindering the sources of private capital and the effort of deleveraging.

== In macroeconomics ==
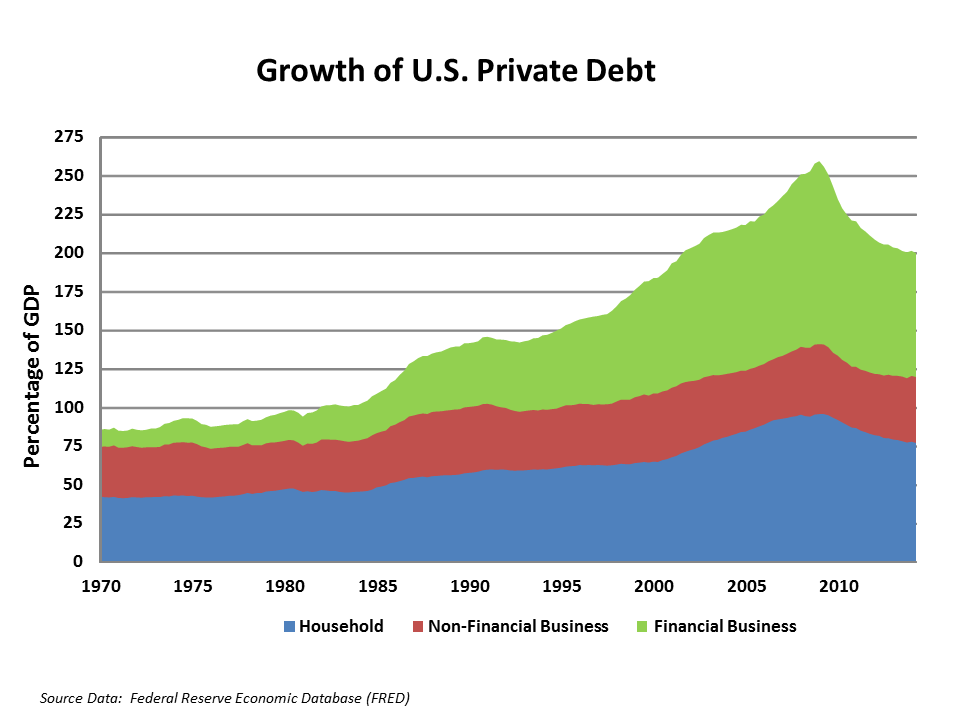
U.S. households and financial businesses began de-leveraging in the years following the subprime mortgage crisis.

Deleveraging of an economy refers to the simultaneous reduction of leverage level in multiple private and public sectors, lowering the total debt to nominal GDP ratio of the economy. Almost every major financial crisis in modern history has been followed by a significant period of deleveraging, which lasts six to seven years on average. Moreover, the process of deleveraging usually begins a few years after the start of the financial crisis.

As in January 2012, four years after the start of the Great Recession, many mature economies and emerging economies in the world had just begun to go through a major period of deleveraging. This is mainly because the continuing rise of government debt, due to the Great Recession, has been offsetting the deleveraging in the private sectors in many countries.

=== Historical episodes ===
The McKinsey Global Institute defines a significant episode of deleveraging in an economy as one in which the ratio of total debt to GDP declines for at least three consecutive years and falls by 10 percent or more. According to this definition, there have been 45 such episodes of deleveraging since 1930, including:

- The Great Depression in the United States: 1929–1943
- United Kingdom: 1947–1980
- 1997 Asian financial crisis: Malaysia 1998–2008
- Latin American debt crisis: Mexico 1982–1992
- Argentina: 2002–2008

Based on this identification of deleveraging and Carmen Reinhart and Kenneth Rogoff’s definition for major episodes of financial crisis, it is found that almost every major financial crisis during the period of study has been followed by a period of deleveraging. After the 2008 financial crisis, economists expected deleveraging to occur globally. Instead the total debt in all nations combined increased by $57 trillion from 2007 to 2015 and government debt increased by $25 trillion. According to the McKinsey Global Institute, from 2007 to 2015, five developing nations and zero advanced ones reduced their debt-to-GDP ratio and 14 countries increased it by 50 percent or more. As of 2015, the ratio of debt to gross domestic product globally has increased by 17 percent after the crisis.

=== Macro-deleveraging process ===
According to a McKinsey Global Institute report, there are four archetypes of deleveraging processes:

1. "Belt-tightening": this is the most common path of deleveraging for an economy. In order to increase net savings, an economy reduces spending and goes through a prolonged period of austerity.
2. "High inflation": high inflation mechanically increases nominal GDP growth, thus reducing the debt to GDP ratio. E.g. Chile in 1984–1991.
3. "Massive default": this usually comes after a severe currency crisis. Stock of debt immediately decreases after massive private and public sector defaults.
4. "Growing out of debt": if an economy experiences rapid (off-trend) real GDP growth, then its debt to GDP ratio will decrease naturally. E.g. US in 1938–1943.

=== Macro-economic consequences ===
Massive deleveraging in corporate and financial sectors can have serious macro-economic consequences, such as triggering Fisherian debt deflation and slowing GDP growth.

In the financial sector, the need to deleverage causes financial intermediaries to shed assets and stop lending, resulting in a credit crunch and tighter borrowing constraint for business, especially the small to medium-sized enterprises. Many times, this process is accompanied by a flight to quality by the lenders and investors as they seek less risky investment. However, many otherwise sound firms could go out of business due to the denied access to credit necessary for operation. Moreover, firms in distress are forced to sell assets quickly to raise cash, causing asset prices to collapse. The pressure of deflation increases the real burden of debt and spreads loss further in the economy.

In addition to causing deflation pressure, firms and households deleveraging their balance sheet often increase net savings by cutting expenditures sharply. Households lower consumption, and firms fire employees and halt investment in new projects, causing unemployment rate to rise and even lower demand of assets. Empirically, consumption and GDP often contracts during the first several years of deleveraging and then recovers, which in some cases cause a fall in total savings in the economy, despite the individuals' higher propensity to save. This is known as the paradox of thrift.

=== Government regulation and fiscal policy ===
According to the theory of leverage cycle of John Geanakoplos and originally by Hyman Minsky, in the absence of intervention, leverage becomes too high in boom times and too low in bust times. As a result, asset prices become too high in boom times and too low in bad times, rather than correctly reflecting the fundamental value of assets. This recurring leveraging-deleveraging cycle is one of the most important amplifying mechanism contributing to the credit cycles and business cycles. Deleveraging is responsible for the continuing fall in the prices of both physical capital and financial assets after the initial market downturn. It is part of the process that leads the economy to recession and the bottom of the leverage cycle.

Therefore, some economists, including John Geanakoplos, strongly argue that the Federal Reserve should monitor and regulate the system-wide leverage level in the economy, limiting leverage in good times and encouraging higher levels of leverage in bad times, by extending lending facilities. Moreover, it is more important to restrict leverage in ebullient times to prevent the crash from happening in the first place.

In addition, in the face of massive private sector deleveraging, monetary policy has limited effect, because the economy is likely to have been pushed up against the zero lower bound, where real interest rate is negative but nominal interest rate cannot fall below zero. Some economists, such as Paul Krugman, have argued that in this case, fiscal policy should step in and deficit-financed government spending can, at least in principle, help avoid a sharp rise in unemployment and the pressure of deflation, therefore facilitating the process of private sector deleveraging and reducing the overall damage to the economy. Note that this comes at the expense of higher government debt, which will compromise the overall deleveraging of the economy. This view is in contrast with some other economists, who argue that a problem created by excessive debt cannot be ultimately solved by running up more debt, because unsustainably high government budget deficit could seriously harm the stability and long-run prospect of the economy.

== See also ==
- Business cycle
- Credit crunch
- Debt deflation
- Financial crisis
- Leverage
- Leverage cycle
- Liquidity trap
- Paradox of thrift
