= Minsky moment =

Sudden collapse of asset values which generates a credit or business cycle

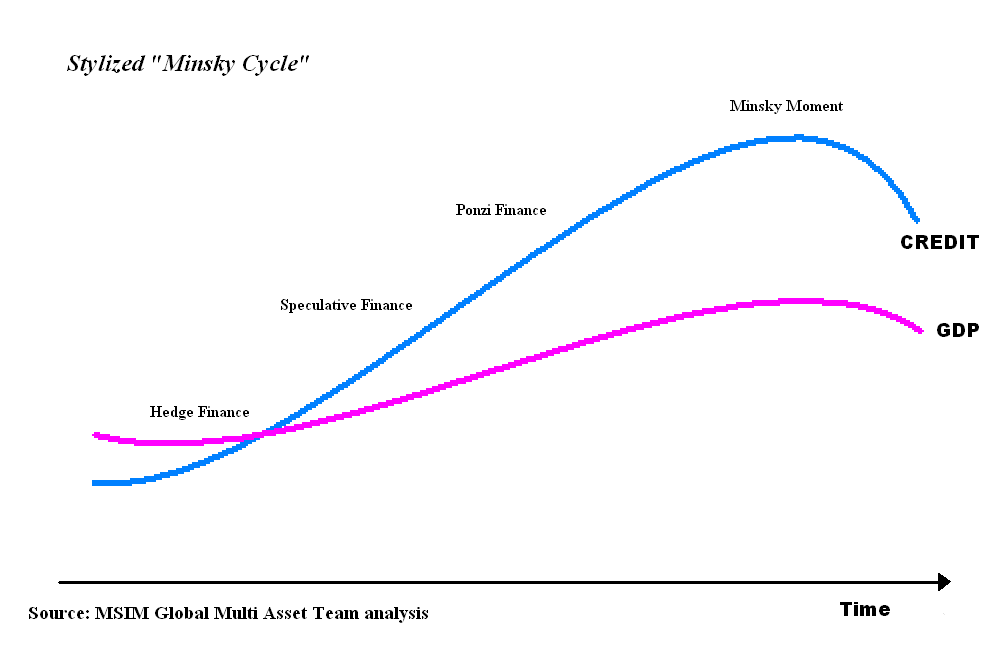
Different phases leading to Minsky Moment

A Minsky moment is a sudden, major collapse of asset values which marks the end of the growth phase of a cycle in credit markets or business activity.

== Description ==
According to the hypothesis, the rapid instability occurs because long periods of steady prosperity and investment gains encourage a diminished perception of overall market risk, which promotes the leveraged risk of investing borrowed money instead of cash. The debt-leveraged financing of speculative investments exposes investors to a potential cash flow crisis, which may begin with a short period of modestly declining asset prices. In the event of a decline, the cash generated by assets is no longer sufficient to pay off the debt used to acquire the assets. Losses on such speculative assets prompt lenders to call in their loans. This rapidly amplifies a small decline into a collapse of asset values, related to the degree of leverage in the market. Leveraged investors are also forced to sell less-speculative positions to cover their loans. In severe situations, no buyers bid at prices recently quoted, fearing further declines. This starts a major sell-off, leading to a sudden and precipitous collapse in market-clearing asset prices, a sharp drop in market liquidity, and a severe demand for cash.

As recovery approaches full employment ... soothsayers will proclaim that the business cycle has been banished [and] debts can be taken on ... But in truth neither the boom, nor the debt deflation ... and certainly not a recovery can go on forever.

— Hyman Minsky, John Maynard Keynes

The more general concept of a "Minsky cycle" consists of a repetitive chain of Minsky moments: a period of stability encourages risk taking, which leads to a period of instability when risks are realized as losses, which quickly exhausts participants into risk-averse trading (de-leveraging), restoring stability and setting up the next cycle. In this more general view, the Minsky cycle may apply to a wide range of human activities, beyond investment economics.

== Context ==
The term was coined by Paul McCulley of PIMCO in 1998, to describe the 1998 Russian financial crisis, and was named after economist Hyman Minsky, who noted that bankers, traders, and other financiers periodically played the role of arsonists, setting the entire economy ablaze. Minsky opposed the deregulation that characterized the 1980s.

Some, such as McCulley, have dated the start of the 2008 financial crisis to a Minsky moment, and called the following crisis a "reverse Minsky journey"; McCulley dates the moment to August 2007, while others date the start to some months earlier or later, such as the June 2007 failure of two Bear Stearns funds.

== See also ==
- 2008 financial crisis, historical example
- Austrian business cycle theory, which faults excessive credit expansion as the cause of collapse events
- Debt deflation, the ensuing collapse of asset prices and falling overall private indebtedness.
- Deleveraging
- Economic bubble
- Financial economics#Departures from rationality, overview of various theoretical approaches to market crises
- Hedge (finance), underlying concept (preventative)
- Leverage cycle
- Margin (finance)
- Ponzi scheme, underlying concept (causative)
- Sub-prime mortgage crisis, somewhat generalized example
- The bezzle, comparable concept related to scams
