= John Geanakoplos =

American economist

- Born: March 18, 1955 (age 71); Urbana, Illinois, U.S.
- Spouse: Anne Higonnet

Academic background
- Education: Yale University (BA); Harvard University (MA, PhD)
- Doctoral advisor: Kenneth Arrow; Jerry Green

Academic work
- Discipline: Mathematical economics
- Institutions: Yale University
- Doctoral students: Stephen Morris; Laurent-Emmanuel Calvet

John Geanakoplos (born March 18, 1955) is an American economist, and the James Tobin Professor of Economics at Yale University.

== Background and education ==
John Geanakoplos was born to a Greek-American family of scholars. His father was the late professor emeritus at Yale Deno Geanakoplos (Greek: Κωνσταντίνος Γιαννακόπουλος), a Greek-American historian of Byzantine cultural and religious history, and his mother, Effie Geanakoplos, was an instructor in psychiatry at the Yale Child Study Center.

In 1970 Geanakoplos won the United States Junior Open Chess Championship. He received his B.A. in mathematics from Yale University in 1975 (summa cum laude), and his M.A. in mathematics and his Ph.D. in economics under Kenneth Arrow and Jerry Green from Harvard University in 1980. In 1980 he became an assistant professor of economics at Yale University, rising to associate professor in 1983, full professor in 1986, and the James Tobin Professor of Economics in 1994.

== Professional career ==
In 1996-2005 Geanakoplos was director of the Cowles Foundation for Research in Economics. He was a co-founder in 2002, and is still co-director, of the Hellenic Studies Program at Yale. He was elected a fellow of the Econometric Society in 1990, and of the American Academy of Arts and Sciences in 1999. He was awarded the Samuelson Prize in 1999, and was awarded the first Bodossaki Prize in economics in 1994 for the best economist of Greek heritage under 40. In 1990-1991 and again in 1999-2000 he directed the economics program at the Santa Fe Institute, where he remains an external professor and chairman of the science steering committee. In 2009–2010 he testified before Congress and before the Financial Crisis Inquiry Commission. He spent terms as visiting professor at MSRI in the University of California, Berkeley, at Churchill College, Cambridge, at the University of Pennsylvania, at Harvard, at Stanford, and at MIT. In 1990-1994 he was a managing director of fixed income research at Kidder, Peabody & Co. He was a founding partner in 1995 of Ellington Management Group, and remains a partner.

== Research ==
Geanakoplos' papers in the 1980s with Paul Klemperer and Jeremy Bulow developed the concept and invented the terminology of strategic complements that is now commonly used in game theory, industrial organization and elsewhere.

Before the 2008 financial crisis, Geanakoplos was known primarily for his contributions to general equilibrium theory, particularly incomplete markets in general equilibrium theory. Geanakoplos and Polemarchakis (1986), for example, establishes key existence and welfare results in a general incomplete markets model.

After the 2008 financial crisis, Geanakoplos' work on the relationship between leverage and asset prices, "The Leverage Cycle," has been prominent in both popular and academic discussions of financial market fluctuations and regulation.

In 2009, Geanakoplos co-authored a work on credit cards and inflation through the Cowles Foundation. His co-author was the mathematical economist and fellow Yale professor Pradeep Dubey.

== Personal life ==
Geanakopolos is married to Barnard College art historian Anne Higonnet.

== Videos ==
Yale University published Geanakoplos' Financial Theory lecture in the Yale Open Courses series.

== Selected publications ==
The following are selected publications from 1998 to date.

- "Uniqueness and Stability of Equilibrium in Economies with Two Goods," (with Kieran Walsh), forthcoming, Journal of Economic Theory. (August 2016) [CFDP 2050]
- "The Credit Surface and Monetary Policy", in Progress and Confusion: The State of Macroeconmic Policy" International Monetary Fund and Massachusetts Institute of Technology. MIT Press, (2016):143-153.
- "Financial Innovation, Collateral and Investment," American Economic Journal: Macroeconomics (January 2016), 8(1): 242-284 (with Ana Fostel) [CFP 1510]
- "Leverage and Default in Binomial Economies: A Complete Characterization" (with A. Fostel), forthcoming Econometrica (December 2015), 83(6): 2191-2229 [CFP 1502]
- "Collateral Equilibrium: I: A Basic Framework" (with William R. Zame), Economic Theory (August 2014), 56(3): 443-492 [CFP 1431]
- "Endogenous Collateral Constraints and the Leverage Cycle" (with Ana Fostel), Annual Review of Economics (May 2014) [CFP 1430]
- "Leverage, Default, and Forgiveness: Lessons of the American and European Crises," Journal of Macroeconomics (March 2014), 39(Part B): 313-333 [CFP 1419]
- "Monitoring Leverage" (with Lasse H. Pedersen), in Markus K. Brunnermeier and Arvind Krishnamurthy, eds., Risk Topography: Systemic Risk and Macro Modeling, NBER, 2014, pp. 175–182 CFDP 1838, CFP 1432
- "Afriat from MinMax," Economic Theory (November 2013), 54(3): 443–448.
- "Asymptotic Behavior of a Stochastic Discount Rate" (with W. Sudderth, O. Zeitouni) (November 2011), forthcoming, Sankhya: The Indian Journal of Statistics (September 2013) Advance online publication doi:10.1007/s13171-013-0037-9
- "Prizes vs. Wages with Envy and Pride," Japanese Economic Review (March 2013), 64(1): 98–121
- "Getting at Systemic Risk via an Agent-Based Model of the Housing Market" (with Robert Axtell, Doyne J. Farmer, Peter Howitt, Benjamin Conlee, Jonathan Goldstein, Matthew Hendrey, Nathan M. Palmer, Chun-Yi Yang), American Economic Review: Papers & Proceedings (May 2012), 102(3): 53–58 [CFP 1358]
- "Leverage Causes Fat Tails and Clustered Volatility," Quantitative Finance (May 2012), 12:5: 695-707 (with Stefan Thurner, J. Doyne Farmer) [CFP 1371]
- "Tranching, CDS, and Asset Prices: How Financial Innovation Can Cause Bubbles and Crashes" (with A. Fostel), American Economic Journal: Macroeconomics (January 2012), 4(1): 190-225 [CFP 1353]
- "Why Does Bad News Increase Volatility and Decrease Leverage" (with A. Fostel), Journal of Economic Theory (March 2012), 147(2): 501-525 [CFP 1354]
- "Incorporating Financial Features into Macroeconomics: Discussion," in Macroeconomic Challenges: The Decade Ahead. Jackson Hole, Federal Reserve Bank of Kansas City Economic Policy Symposium, 2011 [CFP 1331]
- "Markets and Contracts," Journal of Mathematical Economics (May 2011), 47(3): 279-288 (with A. Bisin, P. Gottardi, E. Minelli, H. Polemarchakis) [CFP 1342]
- "Credit Cards and Inflation" (with P. Dubey), Games and Economic Behavior (November 2010), 70(2): 325-353 [CFP 1330]
- "Solving the Present Crisis and Managing the Leverage Cycle" Federal Reserve Bank of New York Economic Policy Review, August 2010, pp. 101–131 [CFP 1305]
- "Reforming Social Security with Progressive Personal Accounts" (with Stephen P. Zeldes) In Jeffrey R. Brown, Jeffrey B. Liebman and David A. Wise, eds., Social Security Policy in a Changing Environment. University of Chicago Press, 2009, pp. 73–121 [CFP 1276]
- "The Virtues and Vices of Equilibrium and the Future of Financial Economics" Complexity (Jan/Feb 2009), 14(3): 11-38 (with J. Doyne Farmer) [CFDP 1647, CFP 1274]
- "Collateral Restrictions and Liquidity Under-Supply: A Simple Model" (with A. Fostel), Economic Theory (2008), 35: 441-467 [CFDP 1468, CFP 1236]
- "Leverage Cycles and the Anxious Economy" (with Ana Fostel), American Economic Review (2008), 98(4): 1211-1244 [CFP 1233]
- "Overlapping Generations Model of General Equilibrium" In "The New Palgrave Dictionary of Economics", Eds. Steven N. Durlauf and Lawrence E. Blume, Palgrave Macmillan, 2008 [CFP 1275]
- "Pareto Improving Taxes" (with H. Polemarchakis), forthcoming in Journal of Mathematical Economics (2007), 44:7-8: 682-696 [CFDP 1576 and CFDP 1662, CFP 1235]
- "Determinacy with Nominal Assets and Outside Money" (with P. Dubey), Economic Theory (2006), 27(1): 79–106. [CFDP 1427R and CFP 1199]
- "The Inflationary Bias of Real Uncertainty and the Harmonic Fisher Equation" (with I. Karatzas, M. Shubik, W.D. Sudderth), Economic Theory (2006), 28(3): 481–512. [CFDP 1424R, CFDP 1333 as "Inflationary Bias in a Simple Stochastic Economy," and CFP 1201]
- "Money and Production, and Liquidity Trap" International Journal of Economic Theory (2006), 2(3/4): 295-317 [CFDP 1574 and CFP 1200]
- "Default and Punishment in General Equilibrium" (with P. Dubey and M. Shubik), Econometrica (2005), 73(1): 1-37. [CFDP 1304RRR, CFDP 1247 as "Default in a General Equilibrium Model with Incomplete Markets," CFDP 879R as "Default and Efficiency in General Equilibrium with Incomplete Markets," and CFP 1108]
- "Demography and the Long-run Predictability of the Stock Market" (with M. Magill and M. Quinzii), Brookings Papers on Economic Activities (2004), 1: 241–325. [CFDP 1380R and CFP 1099]
- "Liquidity, Default, and Crashes: Endogenous Contracts in General Equilibrium," Advances in Economics and Econometrics: Theory and Applications, Eighth World Conference, Volume II, Econometric Society Monographs (2003), pp. 170–205. [CFDP 1316RR and CFP 1074]
- "Inside and Outside Fiat Money, Gains to Trade, and IS-LM" (with Pradeep Dubey), Economic Theory (2003), 21(2–3): 347–397. [CFDP 1257R and CFP 1052]
- "Nash and Walras Equilibrium Via Brouwer," Economic Theory (2003), 21(2–3): 585–603. [CFDP 1131RRR and CFP 1058]
- "Is Gold An Efficient Store of Value?" (with P. Dubey and M. Shubik), Economic Theory (2003), 21(4): 767–782. [CFDP 1031R2 and CFP 1084.]
- "From Nash to Walras via Shapley-Shubik" (with P. Dubey), Journal of Mathematical Economics (2003), 39: 391–400. [CFDP 1360]
- "Monetary Equilibrium with Missing Markets" (with P. Dubey), Journal of Mathematical Economics (2003), 39: 585–618. [CFDP 1389 and CFP 1063]
- "Savings and Portfolio Choice in a Two-Period, Two-Asset Economy" (with S. Aura and P. Diamond.), American Economic Review (2002), 92(4): 1185–91. [CFDP 1268 and CFP 1078]
- "Competitive Pooling: Rothschild-Stiglitz Reconsidered" (with P. Dubey), The Quarterly Journal of Economics (2002), 117(4): 1529–1570. [CFDP 1346RR, CFDP 1305, as "Signalling and Default: Rothschild and Stiglitz Reconsidered," and CFP 1048]
- "The Hierarchical Approach to Modeling Knowledge and Common Knowledge" (with R. Fagin, J.Y. Halpern, M.Y. Vardi), International Journal of Game Theory, (1999), 28(3): 331–365. [CFDP 1213 and CFP 984]
- "Social Security Money’s Worth" (with O. Mitchell and S. Zeldes). In O. Mitchell, R. Myers and H. Young (eds.), Prospects for Social Security Reform. Pension Research Council, The Wharton School, University of Pennsylvania Press, Philadelphia, 1999, pp. 79–151. Reprinted by the Pension Research Council, The Wharton School, University of Pennsylvania, 2000. [CFDP 1193 and CFP 1005]
- "A Strategic Market Game with Active Bankruptcy" (with I. Karatzas, M. Shubik and W. Sudderth), Journal of Mathematical Economics (2000), 34(3): 359–396. [CFDP 1183 and CFP 1008]
- "A Note on the Economic Rationalization of Gun Control," (with V. Chaudhri), (1998), Economic Letters, 58(1): 51–53.
