= Geanakoplos =

Geanakoplos is a surname, Americanized from the Greek surname "Giannakopoulous". Notable people with the surname include:

- Deno Geanakoplos (1916–2007), American historian
- John Geanakoplos (born 1955), American economist
