= Credit crunch =

Financial situation where credit/loans become less available/obtainable

A credit crunch (a credit squeeze, credit tightening or credit crisis) is a sudden reduction in the general availability of loans (or credit) or a sudden tightening of the conditions required to obtain a loan from banks. A credit crunch generally involves a reduction in the availability of credit independent of a rise in official interest rates. In such situations, the relationship between credit availability and interest rates changes. Credit becomes less available at any given official interest rate, or there ceases to be a clear relationship between interest rates and credit availability (i.e. credit rationing occurs). Many times, a credit crunch is accompanied by a flight to quality by lenders and investors, as they seek less risky investments, often at the expense of small to medium-sized enterprises.

== Causes ==
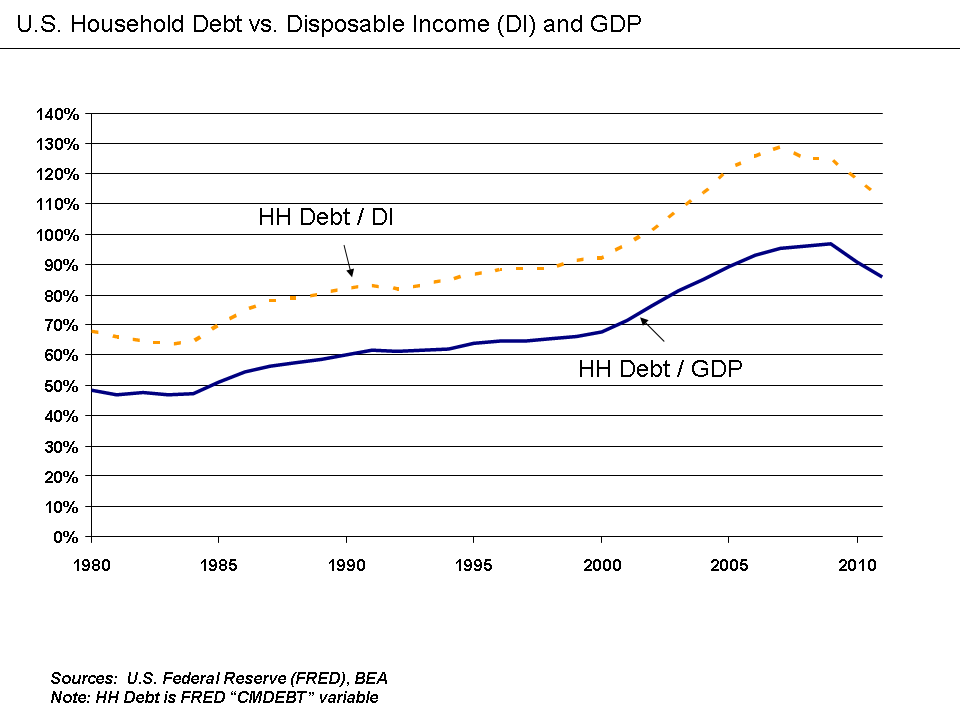
U.S. household debt relative to disposable income and GDP.

A credit crunch is often caused by a sustained period of careless and inappropriate lending which results in losses for lending institutions and investors in debt when the loans turn sour and the full extent of bad debts becomes known.

There are a number of reasons banks might suddenly stop or slow lending activity. For example, inadequate information about the financial condition of borrowers can lead to a boom in lending when financial institutions overestimate creditworthiness, while the sudden revelation of information suggesting that borrowers are or were less creditworthy can lead to a sudden contraction of credit. Other causes can include an anticipated decline in the value of the collateral used by the banks to secure the loans; an exogenous change in monetary conditions (for example, where the central bank suddenly and unexpectedly raises reserve requirements or imposes new regulatory constraints on lending); the central government imposing direct credit controls on the banking system; or even an increased perception of risk regarding the solvency of other banks within the banking system.

=== Easy credit conditions ===
Easy credit conditions (sometimes referred to as "easy money" or "loose credit") are characterized by low interest rates for borrowers and relaxed lending practices by bankers, making it easy to get inexpensive loans. A credit crunch is the opposite, in which interest rates rise and lending practices tighten. Easy credit conditions mean that funds are readily available to borrowers, which results in asset prices rising if the loaned funds are used to buy assets in a particular market, such as real estate or stocks.

=== Bubble formation ===
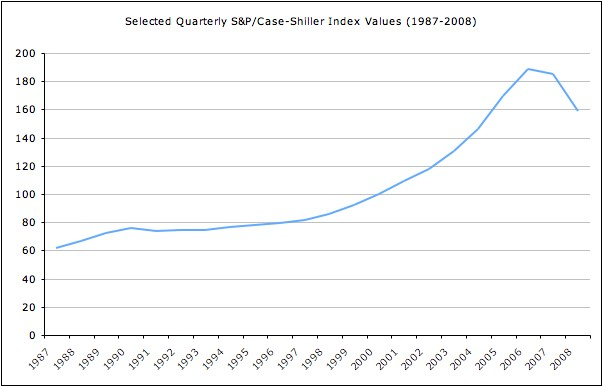
U.S. house price trend (1987–2008) as measured by the Case-Shiller index. Between 2000 and 2006 housing prices nearly doubled, rising from 100 to nearly 200 on the index.

In a credit bubble, lending standards become less stringent. Easy credit drives up prices within a class of assets, usually real estate or equities. These increased asset values then become the collateral for further borrowing. During the upward phase in the credit cycle, asset prices may experience bouts of frenzied competitive, leveraged bidding, inducing inflation in a particular asset market. This can then cause a speculative price "bubble" to develop. As this upswing in new debt creation also increases the money supply and stimulates economic activity, this also tends to temporarily raise economic growth and employment.

Economist Hyman Minsky described the progressive risk-taking by borrowers and lenders that contribute to a bubble by categorizing types of borrowing and lending. The "hedge borrower", representing conservative risk-taking, can meet debt payment obligations covering both interest and amortization (gradual repayment) of principal from current cash flows generated by invested capital. The borrower's and the lender's risk is limited by the borrower's ample current capacity to pay interest and by the gradual reduction in the principal outstanding.

For the next type, the "speculative borrower", the cash flow from invested capital can service the debt, i.e., cover the interest due, but the borrower must regularly roll over, or re-borrow, the principal. The "speculative borrower" is betting on the asset value of invested capital rising, but taking on significant risk that his ability to refinance principal when due may be impaired by a rise in interest rates, a fall in asset prices or other changes in credit terms and conditions. A "speculative borrower" is bearing a lower interest expense to invest in owning an asset and consequently may be able to and be inclined by optimistic views to bid up the market price of the asset. As "speculative borrowers" do bid up the price of leveraged assets and profit as a result, the history of that successful borrowing and lending experience serves to reduce the perceived risks, driving additional lending and bidding up of assets embodying invested capital.

With the experience of appreciating asset values reducing perceived risks, the "Ponzi borrower" (named for Charles Ponzi, see also Ponzi scheme) emerges, to borrow based on the optimistic belief that the appreciation of the value of the asset will be sufficient not just to refinance the principal repayment when due, but also to cover interest expense. The "Ponzi borrower" can not expect cash flows from capital invested in an asset to be sufficient to pay in full current interest, but is betting that asset value appreciation can be liquidated in time to complete payment of interest and to repay or refinance principal. Demand for investment assets financed by "Ponzi borrowers" can drive up asset values further, contributing to an "asset bubble". (In comparison, in a classic Ponzi scheme, a financial intermediary fraudulently promises investment returns from a fund, but relies on new investment into the fund to fund dividends and redemptions, and may not have invested capital in income-producing assets at all.)

Often it is only in retrospect that participants in an economic bubble realize that the point of collapse was obvious. In this respect, economic bubbles can have dynamic characteristics not unlike Ponzi schemes or pyramid schemes.

=== Psychological ===
Several psychological factors contribute to bubbles and related busts.

- Social herding refers to following the behavior of others, assuming they understand what is happening. As John Maynard Keynes observed in 1931 during the Great Depression: "A sound banker, alas, is not one who foresees danger and avoids it, but one who, when he is ruined, is ruined in a conventional way along with his fellows, so that no one can really blame him."
- People may assume that unusually favorable trends (e.g., exceptionally low interest rates and prolonged asset price increases) will continue indefinitely.
- Incentives may also encourage risky behavior, particularly where the negative consequences if a bet goes sour are shared collectively. The tendency of government to bail out financial institutions that get into trouble (e.g., Long-term Capital Management and the subprime mortgage crisis) provide examples of such moral hazard.
- People may assume that "this time is different", which psychologist Daniel Kahneman refers to as the inside view, as opposed to the outside view, which is based on historical or better objective information.

These and other cognitive biases that impair judgment can contribute to credit bubbles and crunches.

=== Valuation of securities ===
The crunch is generally caused by a reduction in the market prices of previously "overinflated" assets and refers to the financial crisis that results from the price collapse. This can result in widespread foreclosure or bankruptcy for those who came in late to the market, as the prices of previously inflated assets generally drop precipitously. In contrast, a liquidity crisis is triggered when an otherwise sound business finds itself temporarily incapable of accessing the bridge finance it needs to expand its business or smooth its cash flow payments. In this case, accessing additional credit lines and "trading through" the crisis can allow the business to navigate its way through the problem and ensure its continued solvency and viability. It is often difficult to know, in the midst of a crisis, whether distressed businesses are experiencing a crisis of solvency or a temporary liquidity crisis.

In the case of a credit crunch, it may be preferable to "mark to market" - and if necessary, sell or go into liquidation if the capital of the business affected is insufficient to survive the post-boom phase of the credit cycle. In the case of a liquidity crisis on the other hand, it may be preferable to attempt to access additional lines of credit, as opportunities for growth may exist once the liquidity crisis is overcome.

== Effects ==
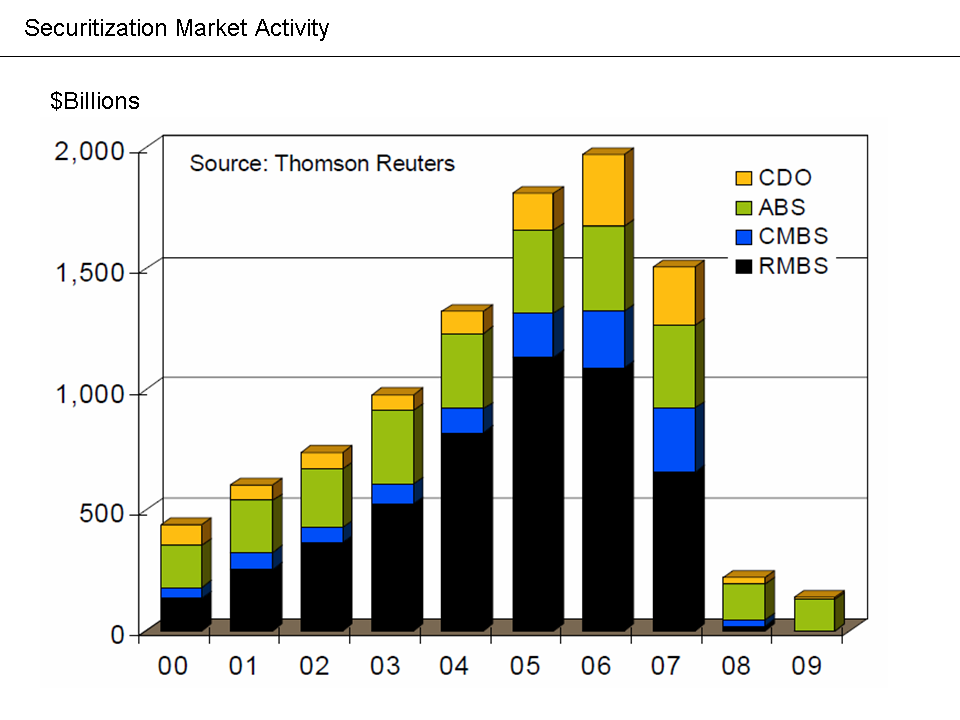
Securitization markets were impaired during the crisis. This shows how readily available credit dried up during the 2007-2008 crisis.

Financial institutions facing losses from a credit crunch may reduce the availability of credit further, and increase the cost of accessing credit by raising interest rates. In some cases lenders may be unable to lend further, even if they wish, as a result of earlier losses. If participants themselves are highly leveraged (i.e., carrying a high debt burden) the damage done when the bubble bursts is more severe, causing recession or depression. Financial institutions may fail, economic growth may slow, unemployment may rise, and social unrest may increase. For example, the ratio of household debt to after-tax income rose from 60% in 1984 to 130% by 2007, contributing to (and worsening) the Subprime mortgage crisis of 2007–2008.

== Historical perspective ==
In recent decades credit crunches have not been rare or black swan events. Although few economists have successfully predicted credit crunch events before they have occurred, Professor Richard Rumelt has written the following in relation to their surprising frequency and regularity in advanced economies around the world: "In fact, during the past fifty years there have been 28 severe house-price boom-bust cycles and 28 credit crunches in 21 advanced Organisation for Economic Co-operation and Development (OECD) economies."

== See also ==
- Austrian business cycle theory
- Debt deflation
- Financial crisis
- Minsky moment
- Liquidity crisis

== Bibliography ==
- George Cooper, The Origin of Financial Crises (2008: London, Harriman House) ISBN 1-905641-85-0
- Graham Turner, The Credit Crunch: Housing Bubbles, Globalisation and the Worldwide Economic Crisis (2008: London, Pluto Press), ISBN 978-0-7453-2810-2
