= Incomplete markets =

In economics, incomplete markets are markets in which there does not exist an Arrow–Debreu security for every possible state of nature. In contrast with complete markets, this shortage of securities will likely restrict individuals from transferring the desired level of wealth among states.

An Arrow security purchased or sold at date t is a contract promising to deliver one unit of income in one of the possible contingencies which can occur at date t + 1. If at each date-event there exists a complete set of such contracts, one for each contingency that can occur at the following date, individuals will trade these contracts in order to insure against future risks, targeting a desirable and budget feasible level of consumption in each state (i.e. consumption smoothing). In most set ups when these contracts are not available, optimal risk sharing between agents will not be possible. For this scenario, agents (homeowners, workers, firms, investors, etc.) will lack the instruments to insure against future risks such as employment status, health, labor income, prices, among others.

== Markets, securities and market incompleteness ==
In a competitive market, each agent makes intertemporal choices in a stochastic environment. Their attitudes toward risk, the production possibility set, and the set of available trades determine the equilibrium quantities and prices of assets that are traded. In an "idealized" representation agents are assumed to have costless contractual enforcement and perfect knowledge of future states and their likelihood. With a complete set of state contingent claims (also known as Arrow–Debreu securities) agents can trade these securities to hedge against undesirable or bad outcomes.

When a market is incomplete, it typically fails to make the optimal allocation of assets. That is, the First Welfare Theorem no longer holds. The competitive equilibrium in an economy with incomplete markets is generically constrained suboptimal. The notion of constrained suboptimality was formalized by Geanakoplos and Polemarchakis (1986).

== Possible reasons for market incompleteness ==
Despite the latest ongoing innovation in financial and insurance markets, markets remain incomplete. While several contingent claims are traded routinely against many states such as insurance policies, futures, financial options, among others, the set of outcomes is far greater than the set of claims.

In practice the idea of a state contingent security for every possible realization of nature seems unrealistic. For example, if the economy lacks the institutions to guarantee that the contracts are enforced, it is unlikely that agents will either sell or buy these securities.

Another common way to motivate the absence of state contingent securities is asymmetric information between agents. For example, the realization of labor income for a given individual is private information and it cannot be known without cost by anyone else. If an insurance company cannot verify the individual's labor income, the former would always have the incentive to claim a low realization of income and the market would collapse.

== Failure of the standard complete markets model ==
Many authors have argued that modeling incomplete markets and other sorts of financial frictions is crucial to explain the counterfactual predictions of the standard complete markets models. The most notable example is the equity premium puzzle Mehra and Prescott (1985), where the complete markets model failed to explain the historical high equity premium and low risk-free rate.

Along with the equity premium puzzle, other counterfactual implications of the complete markets model are related to the empirical observations concerning individuals’ consumption, wealth, and market transactions. For example, in a complete market framework, given that agents can fully insure against idiosyncratic risks, each individual's consumption must fluctuate as much as anyone else's, and the relative position in terms wealth distribution of an individual should not vary much over time. The empirical evidence suggests otherwise. Further, consumption is not highly correlated across agents, and wealth holdings are volatile.

== Modeling market incompleteness ==
In the economic and financial literature, a significant effort has been made in recent years to part from the setting of complete markets. Market incompleteness is modeled as an exogenous institutional structure or as an endogenous process.

In the first approach, the economic models take as given the institutions and arrangements observed in actual economies. This approach has two advantages. First the structure of the model is similar to that of the Arrow–Debreu model to make it amenable to the powerful techniques of analysis developed for that framework. Second it is easy to compare model allocations with their empirical counterpart. Among the first papers using this approach, Diamond (1967) focused directly on the “realistic” market structure consisting of the stock and bond markets.

The other set of models explicitly account for the frictions that could prevent full insurance, but derive the optimal risk-sharing endogenously. This literature has focused on information frictions. Risk sharing in private information models with asset accumulation and enforcement frictions. The advantage of this approach is that market incompleteness and the available state contingent claims respond to the economic environment, which makes the model appealing for policy experiments since it is less vulnerable to the Lucas critique.

== Example of complete vs. incomplete markets ==
Suppose there is an economy with two agents (Robinson and Jane) with identical log utility functions. There are two equally likely states of nature. If state 1 is realized, Robinson is endowed with 1 unit of wealth and Jane with 0. In state 2, Robinson gets 0 while Jane receives 1 unit of wealth. With Complete Markets there are two state contingent claims:

- $q_1$ pays 1 unit in state 1 and 0 otherwise.
- $q_2$ pays 1 unit in state 2 and 0 in state 1.

Before the realization of the uncertainty, the two agents can trade the state contingent securities. In equilibrium, the two Arrow-Debreu securities have the same price and the allocation is as follows:

- Robinson buys 0.5 of $q_2$ and sells 0.5 of $q_1$.
- Jane buys 0.5 of $q_1$ and sells 0.5 of $q_2$.

The main outcome in this economy is that both Robinson and Jane will end up with 0.5 units of wealth independently of the state of nature that is realized.

If the market is incomplete, meaning one or both of the securities are not available for trade, the two agents can't trade to hedge against a bad realization of nature and thus remain exposed to the possibility of the undesirable outcome of having zero wealth. In fact, with certainty, one of the agents will be 'rich' and the other 'poor'.

This example is an extreme case of market incompleteness. In practice, agents do have some type of savings or insurance instrument. The main point here is to illustrate the potential welfare losses that can arise if markets are incomplete.

== See also ==
- Complete market
- Financial innovation

== Literature ==
- Magill, Michael J.P.; Quinzii, Martine (1996), Theory of Incomplete Markets, vol. I, Cambridge (Massachusetts), London (England): The MIT Press, ISBN 0-262-13324-5
