= Anne Higonnet =

American art historian (born 1958 or 1959)

- Born: 1958 or 1959 (age 67–68)
- Spouse: John Geanakoplos
- Awards: Guggenheim Fellowship (2001)

Academic background
- Education: Harvard University (BA); Yale University (PhD)

Academic work
- Discipline: Art history
- Institutions: Wellesley College; Barnard College

Anne Higonnet is an American art historian. She is Ann Whitney Olin Professor at Barnard College.

== Biography ==
Higonnet received her B.A. from Harvard University in 1980 and Ph.D. from Yale University in 1988. She was an assistant professor at Wellesley College before joining the Barnard College faculty.

Higonnet's scholarship focuses on 19th century art, art collecting, and the history of childhood. She created an online project with the Morgan Library & Museum on fashion plates from the Journal des Dames et des Modes from 1797 to 1804 to demonstrate the revolution in women's fashion during the early 19th century, namely, how women turned their underwear into outerwear, adopted Indian textiles, and invented the handbag. She is a biographer of Berthe Morisot.

Her students include Denise Murrell, curator at the Metropolitan Museum of Art.

Higonnet was a 2019-2020 Radcliffe fellow. She also received a 2001 Guggenheim Fellowship.

She is currently married to Yale University economist John Geanakoplos.

In 2010, Higonnet was arrested and charged with disorderly conduct for an incident involving the parent of a Worthington Hooker Middle School student. It was alleged that Higonnet grabbed the parent's collar and yelled at them for improperly using the Everit Street back gate, which abuts a residential street, instead of using the front entrance. She faced a fine of up to $500 or up to three months in jail. The case was dismissed five months later, after Higonnet voluntarily served 10 hours of community service and wrote a “letter of regret.”
