= Mike Vranos =

American hedge fund manager and philanthropist

Michael Vranos
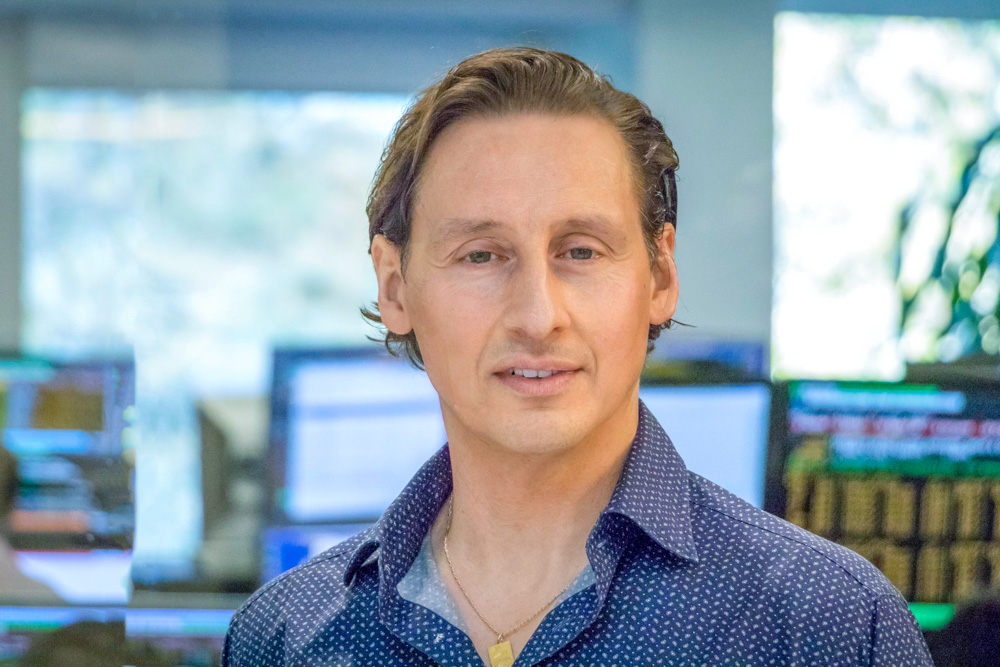
- Born: Worcester, Massachusetts
- Other name: Mike
- Education: B.A. in mathematics Harvard University, 1983 magna cum laude
- Occupations: Hedge fund manager and bond trader
- Employer(s): Kidder Peabody, Ellington Management Group
- Title: Founder, CEO

Michael W. Vranos is an American hedge fund manager and philanthropist who in the 1990s was referred to by some as the "most powerful man on Wall Street." In 1993, he reportedly earned $15 million from trading mortgage bonds. Fortune Magazine once called him "one of the best bond traders on Wall Street." According to a 2007 Wall Street Journal article, he has continued to be regarded as "the best-known mortgage-bond trader on Wall Street."

Vranos headed collateralized mortgage obligation (CMO) trading in the early 1990s at Kidder Peabody at a time when that firm dominated the marketplace. Seizing the opportunity created by a bear market, he left to start his own firm, Ellington Management Group, in late 1994. That same year, Kidder Peabody fell on troubled times and was sold to PaineWebber. In spite of being affected by fall-out from the Long-Term Capital Management debacle in 1998, as of April 2004, Ellington had delivered a composite annualized return of 15.4%, after fees.

== Early life and education ==
Vranos was born in Worcester, Massachusetts to Alexander and Aglaea Vranos, both of Greek descent. He was then raised in Ellington, Connecticut, United States. In his youth, he worked as a bouncer and earned the title of Mr. Teen Connecticut as a bodybuilder. He earned the nickname "The Arm". Mr. Vranos earned his Bachelor of Arts degree in mathematics from Harvard University in 1983 with both magna cum laude and Phi Beta Kappa honors. He began pursuing a PhD in Mathematics, before beginning his work on Wall Street.

== Kidder Peabody ==
Vranos started work at Kidder Peabody after graduation from Harvard in 1983. He was the youngest Managing Director in the firm's 130-year history. During his reign at Kidder from 1990–1994, the company underwrote over $200 billion in CMOs, which was about 20% of all CMOs issued during that period and nearly double the next largest Wall Street firm. Vranos was noted for having turned his collateralized mortgage obligation trading role into a money-making machine. In 1991, Vranos was named Kidder Peabody’s Man of the Year. His 1992 compensation was estimated at between $10–15 million, according to the USA Today, while The Washington Post reported it in the $5–7 million range. By 1993 he was the highest paid employee at Kidder Peabody, and it was said that as Kidder entered financial trouble in the early 1990s that the profitability of the company was largely on Vranos' back.

Kidder Peabody fell on troubled times during the bear market of 1994. Losses in the mortgage-bonds department headed by Vranos for the second quarter of 1994 were $30 million. Michael Carpenter, the CEO of Kidder from 1989 to 1994 was forced to resign in July 1994. Then, when the number two ranking executive at the firm, Edward A. Cerullo, resigned from Kidder Peabody a few weeks later, Vranos was one of the most watched firm members. During this period, Vranos was highly praised by Jack Welch, chairman of Kidder Peabody’s parent company, General Electric, for his handling of the bear market. However, as market conditions grew more severe, Vranos left to start his own firm in late 1994. Kidder was ultimately sold to Paine Webber.

== Ellington Management Group ==
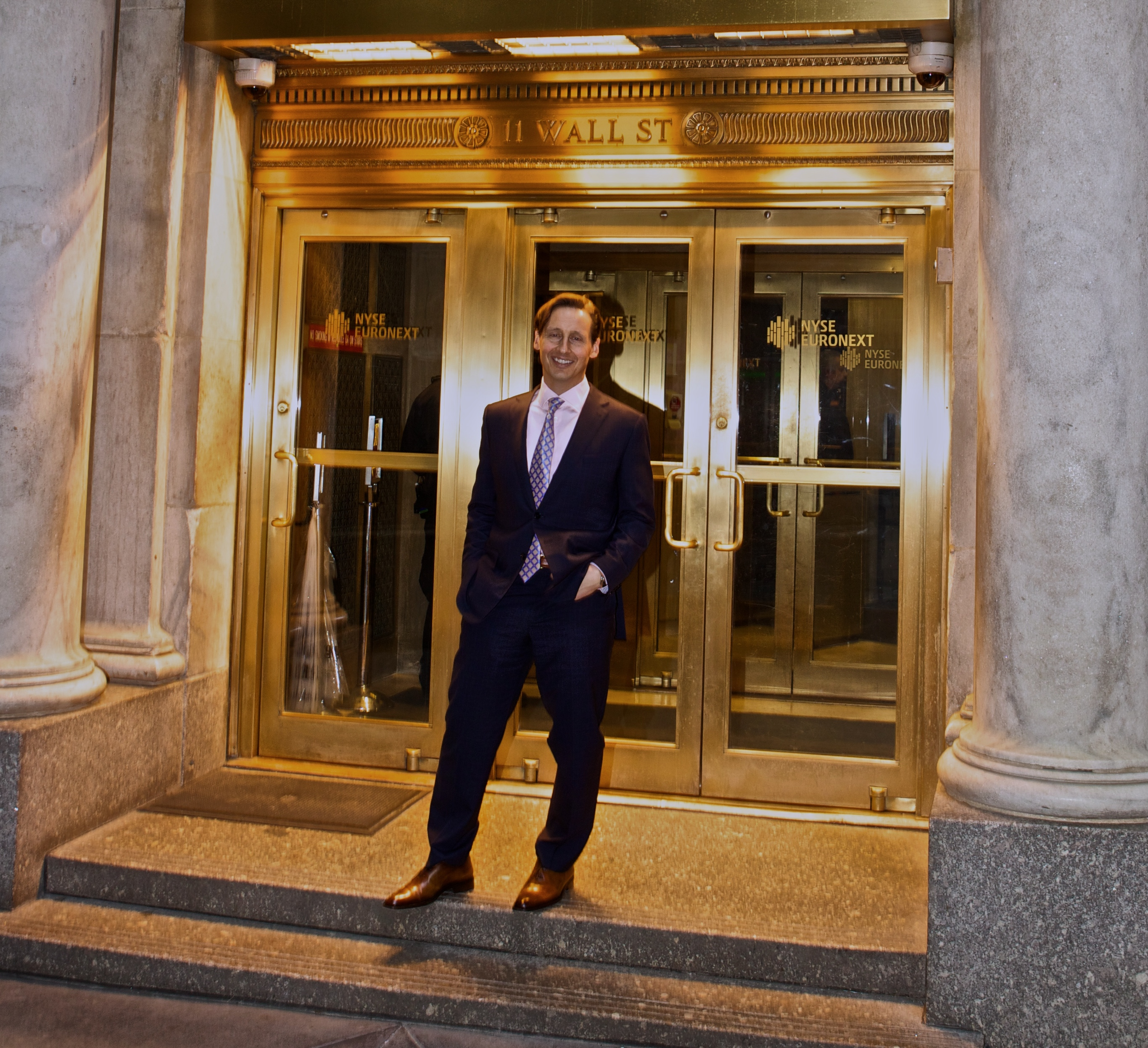
Michael Vranos in front of the New York Stock Exchange

In late 1994, Vranos founded Ellington Management Group, which grew into a $21 billion company. He founded the firm with Laurence Penn, whom Vranos knew at Harvard and who was in charge of Lehman Brother's mortgage securities training before co-founding Ellington with funding from Ziff Brothers Investments. By the end of 1995 the firm had become a three-fund operation with a variety of assets.

Ellington was affected by the Long-Term Capital Management debacle in 1998. For a few days in mid-October, the firm sold mortgage securities to lower its funds' leverage. The firm issued a public statement describing its borrowings to quell public fears, which was considered unusual for hedge funds at the time. It clarified that although it was meeting margin calls by unloading hundreds of millions of dollars in assets over a two-day period, losses were limited. One report suggests some of his hedge funds may have temporarily lost around 25% of their value as he liquidated $2 billion in assets after allegedly missing a margin call from UBS. However, from its December 1994 inception through April 2004, the firm delivered a composite annualized return of 15.4%, after fees.

In 2000, Ellington bid on Laser Mortgage Management Inc., a mortgage real estate investment trust that was considering closing, but ultimately did not purchase it. Various of Ellington's funds have invested in distressed mortgage-backed securities over time. By 2004 his $3 billion in hedge fund assets including mortgage derivatives. In October 2007, as the future credit performance of residential mortgages became increasingly uncertain, one of his funds is reported to have fallen in value by 22% and to have temporarily suspended redemptions pending greater clarity around valuations. As of 2007, Vranos and Ellington Management managed $5.4 billion in hedge funds and private accounts, and an additional $1.2 billion in a managed account, while also managing almost $23 billion in collateralized debt obligations. In 2014 Vranos opened an office for Ellington Management in London, England in order to expand into the European market.

In June 2007, Vranos launched a private placement of a new entity, Ellington Financial LLC, to institutional investors. The offering primarily targeted investments in non-agency mortgage-backed securities. The deal was underwritten by Friedman Billings Ramsey and although originally slated for a $750 million offering, evolving market conditions only allowed for a $250 million capital raise. Before the private placement, a New York Times columnist noted that a portion of the private placement might be used to purchase risky tranches from bankrupt subprime lender New Century Financial Corporation and noted the potential difficulty in valuing such instruments. In October 2010, Ellington Financial LLC went public, debuting on the NYSE. As of 2 January 2012, Vranos owned (directly or indirectly) over 2.5 million shares. According to its public filings, Ellington Financial invests primarily in non-agency mortgage-backed securities, but also holds agency pools and other mortgage-related securities, and had a total return of 59% between its August 2007 inception and the end of 2011.

Ellington Residential Mortgage REIT, chaired and founded by Vranos, went public on the NYSE after its IPO in late 2013, trading under the ticker symbol EARN.

== Personal ==
In 1981, Vranos was declared Mr. Teen Connecticut in the state's bodybuilding championships, and he became known as "Captain Iron" in bodybuilding circles. Vranos is known for breaking up business meetings to issue armwrestling challenges. Vranos currently lives in Greenwich, Connecticut. In 2001, Slate.com finance columnist Rob Walker and alternative cartoonist Josh Neufeld featured Vranos in their comic book, Titans of Finance (Alternative Comics, 2001, ISBN 1-891867-05-9). Vranos supported both Christopher Dodd and Barack Obama on the Democratic side and Rudy Giuliani on the Republican side of the 2008 Presidential Election.

== Philanthropy ==
Michael Vranos is a director of Hedge Funds Care, Boys & Girls Harbor, the Waterside School in Stamford, and Hopkins school in New Haven. He is a contributor to and former director of Stamford Shelter for the Homeless and the East Harlem School. Hedge Funds Care presented Vranos with its Lifetime Award for Caring in 2007. He also established the Michael and Anna Vranos Graduate Fellowship Fund in the Life Sciences, the Vranos Family Junior Faculty Development Fund for Stem Cell and Regenerative Biology, and the Vranos Family Graduate Research Fellowship in Developmental and Regenerative Biology, all at Harvard University. According to Harvard Alumni, "He has also offered his time and support to Harvard as a member of the FAS Task Force on Balanced Philanthropy, as chair of the Class of 1983 Gift Committee, as a member of the New York Major Gifts Committee, and as chair of the Class of 1983’s 20th and 25th reunions." In December 2022, the Vranos Family Foundation provided a grant to Harvard University researchers to study brain aging and neurodegenerative diseases. The five-year grant will provide support for investigators across the Faculty of Arts and Sciences (FAS) and Harvard Medical School (HMS) to challenge the concept that functional decline associated with aging is irreversible.
