= The bezzle =

Term in economics

The bezzle is a term originally coined by John Kenneth Galbraith for a long-term pattern of bad faith in which the mark does not realize at the time that they have been a victim, and may even feel that they have gained in the short term, until being disillusioned later on. The term is a contraction of the word "embezzlement". The bezzle does not necessarily require criminal acts; the creation of illusionary wealth suffices.

Charles Munger extended Galbraith's concept to include the apparent wealth created by the bezzle and the economic effects created by that apparent wealth, which can go far beyond the actual creation of illusory wealth.

In 2024, Cory Doctorow published a novel entitled The Bezzle, with a forensic accountant main character challenging a corrupt system.

== See also ==
- Financial bubble
- Ponzi scheme
- Minsky moment, comparable concept associated with financial crises
