= Deno Geanakoplos =

American historian (1916–2007)

- Κωνσταντίνος Γιαννακόπουλος
- Born: Deno John Geanakoplos; August 11, 1916; Minneapolis, Minnesota, U.S.
- Died: October 4, 2007 (aged 91); Hamden, Connecticut, U.S.

Academic background
- Education: University of Minnesota (BA, MA); University of Pisa; Harvard University (PhD)

Academic work
- Main interests: Byzantine history and its influence on the Renaissance

Deno John Geanakoplos (Greek: Κωνσταντίνος Γιαννακόπουλος; August 11, 1916 – October 4, 2007) was an American scholar of Byzantine cultural and religious history and Italian Renaissance intellectual history and the Bradford Durfee Professor Emeritus of Byzantine History, Renaissance History, and Eastern Orthodox Church History at Yale University. He was the author of 13 books and over 100 articles and was considered one of the foremost Byzantine scholars in the world. He was the father of Yale economist John Geanakoplos.

== Early life and education ==
Geanakoplos was born in 1916 in Minneapolis, Minnesota, to parents of Greek ancestry. He studied music before becoming a historian. He earned a diploma in violin from the Juilliard School of Music in 1939 and then played in the first violin section in the Minneapolis Symphony Orchestra under Dimitri Mitropoulos. Simultaneously, he pursued a B.A. in history from the University of Minnesota, receiving it in 1941. In 1942, he enlisted in the U.S. Army with a school friend, Sydney Ahlstrom, both of whom eventually became history professors at Yale.

Geanakoplos was sent to North Africa, where he learned French, and then was in the first wave of American soldiers to reach Sicily, where he learned Italian. Becoming increasingly interested in Italian culture, he managed to enroll and complete the Dottore in lettere at the University of Pisa in 1946, writing his dissertation in Italian. Leaving the Army as a captain, he returned to the symphony and the University of Minnesota, where he was awarded an M.A. in 1946. He enrolled in the Graduate School of Harvard University in 1947, completing his Ph.D. in history in 1953, meanwhile serving as concertmaster of the Harvard-Radcliffe Symphony Orchestra.

== Career ==
Professor Geanakoplos's first teaching positions were at Brandeis University and at the Greek Theological Seminary in Boston. From 1954 to 1967, he taught medieval history at the University of Illinois, before joining the faculty at Yale, where he remained until his retirement in 1987. After his son John joined the Yale economics faculty in 1980, they became only the third father-son pair to be tenured professors concurrently in the university's history.

Deno Geanakoplos was elected president of the American Society of Church History in 1983 and was a fellow of the Medieval Academy of America, the American Historical Association and the Renaissance Society of America. In 1975 he was awarded the title of Archon “Teacher of the People” by the Patriarch of the Greek Orthodox Church in Constantinople.

Geanakoplos's numerous books include: Emperor Michael Palaeologus and the West, 1258-1282: a study in Byzantine-Latin relations (Harvard University Press, 1959), Greek scholars in Venice: studies in the dissemination of Greek learning from Byzantium to Western Europe (Harvard University Press, 1962), Byzantium and the Renaissance: Greek scholars in Venice: studies in the dissemination of Greek learning from Byzantium to Western Europe (Archon Books, 1973), Interaction of the "sibling" Byzantine and Western cultures in the Middle Ages and Italian Renaissance: (330-1600) (Yale University Press, 1976), Medieval Western Civilization and the Byzantine and Islamic worlds: Interaction of three cultures (D.C. Heath, 1979), Byzantium: Church, Society, and Civilization Seen Through Contemporary Eyes (University of Chicago Press, 1984), Constantinople and the West: Essays on the Late Byzantine (Palaeologan) and Italian Renaissances and the Byzantine and Roman Churches (University of Wisconsin Press, 1989).

His research showed the pivotal role that Byzantine scholars who emigrated to Italy played in unlocking and interpreting ancient Greek texts vital to the Italian Renaissance, systematically documenting their interactions in the West. He deeply probed the encounters between the Greek and Roman churches over centuries of recurring schism and attempted reunion, including the Councils of Lyons, Basel and especially Florence, during which the churches agreed to reconcile.

== Personal life ==
His brother Christie John Geanakoplos, who died in 2005, was professor of chemical engineering at the University of Minnesota. He was married to Effie Geanakoplos, a clinical social worker and instructor in psychiatry at the Yale Child Study Center, for 48 years. She predeceased him in 2001. His son John Geanakoplos is the James Tobin Professor of Economics at Yale University. His daughter Constance is a concert pianist in New York.

== Awards and honors ==
- President, American Society of Church History
- Fellow, Medieval Academy of America
- Fellow, American Historical Association
- Fellow, Renaissance Society of America
- Guggenheim Fellowship Grant
- Fulbright Grant
- American Council of Learned Societies Grant
- First Orthodox lay person invited to attend the Vatican Council II in 1962
- Gold Cross of the Order of George I in 1966

== Bibliography ==
=== Books (author) ===
- Emperor Michael Palaeologus and the West, 1258-1282: a study in Byzantine-Latin relations (Harvard University Press, 1959).
- Greek scholars in Venice: studies in the dissemination of Greek learning from Byzantium to Western Europe (Harvard University Press, 1962).
- Byzantine East and Latin West: Two Worlds of Christendom in Middle Ages and Renaissance (Barnes and Noble, 1966).
- Byzantium and the Renaissance: Greek scholars in Venice: studies in the dissemination of Greek learning from Byzantium to Western Europe (Archon Books, 1973).
- Interaction of the "sibling" Byzantine and Western cultures in the Middle Ages and Italian Renaissance: (330-1600) (Yale University Press, 1976).
- Medieval Western Civilization and the Byzantine and Islamic worlds: Interaction of three cultures (D.C. Heath, 1979).
- Byzantium: Church, Society, and Civilization Seen Through Contemporary Eyes (University of Chicago Press, 1984).
- Constantinople and the West: Essays on the Late Byzantine (Palaeologan) and Italian Renaissances and the Byzantine and Roman Churches (University of Wisconsin Press, 1989).
- A Short History of the Ecumenical Patriarchate of Constantinople (330-1990) "First Among Equals" in the Eastern Orthodox Church (Holy Cross Orthodox Press, 1990).

=== Articles (author) ===
- "Greco-Latin Relations on the Eve of the Byzantine Restoration: The Battle of Pelagonia-1259.” Dumbarton Oaks Papers, vol. 7, Harvard University Press, Jan. 1953, pp. 99–141, doi:10.2307/1291057.
- “The Nicene Revolution of 1258 and the Usurpation of Michael VIII Palaeologos.” Traditio, vol. 9, Cambridge University Press, 1953, pp. 420–30, doi:10.1017/S0362152900003792.
- “Some Aspects of the Influence of the Byzantine Maximos the Confessor on the Theology of East and West.” Church History, vol. 38, no. 2, Cambridge University Press, June 1969, pp. 150–63, doi:10.2307/3162703.
- “Church Building and ‘Caesaropapism,’ A.D. 312–565.” Greek, Roman and Byzantine Studies, vol. 7, no. 2, Duke University, Jan. 2003, pp. 167–86.
