= Martine Quinzii =

French mathematical economist

- Died: 25 May 2018

Academic background
- Education: University of Paris II Panthéon-Assas; Pierre and Marie Curie University

Academic work
- Discipline: financial markets incomplete markets macroeconomics general equilibrium theory
- Institutions: University of California, Davis

Martine Quinzii (died May 25, 2018) was a French mathematical economist known for her work in financial markets, incomplete markets, macroeconomics, and general equilibrium theory.

== Education and career ==
Quinzii studied mathematics at the University of Paris VI, earning a master's degree in 1970, an agrégation in mathematics in 1971, and a Master of Advanced Studies in 1972. She completed a Ph.D. at the University of Paris II Panthéon-Assas in 1986. Her dissertation, Rendements croissants et équilibre général, was supervised by Jean Fericelli.

She taught in several French universities from 1972 through 1986, and earned a habilitation in 1988, but by 1986 she had already moved to the University of Southern California in the US. In 1991 she moved to the department of economics at the University of California, Davis and remained there until her retirement in 2016, serving two terms as department chair from 1995 to 1999 and 2006 to 2007.

== Books ==
Quinzii wrote a French monograph on econometrics, Rendements Croissants et Efficacité Economique (CNRS, 1988) as her habilitation thesis, and wrote the book Increasing Returns and Efficiency (Oxford University Press, 1992). With Michael Magill (her husband), she was the author of Theory of Incomplete Markets (MIT Press, 1996), and of the two-volume work Incomplete Markets, Vol. I: Finite Horizon Economies and Incomplete Markets, Vol. II: Infinite Horizon Economies (Edward Elgar Publishing, 2008).

== Recognition ==
Quinzii was elected as a Fellow of the Econometric Society in 2000, and as a Fellow of the Society for the Advancement of Economic Theory in 2011.
