= Ellington Management Group =

Hedge fund operation

- Type: Private
- Industry: Investment Management
- Founded: 1994; 32 years ago
- Founders: Mike Vranos; Laurence Penn
- Headquarters: Old Greenwich, Connecticut, United States
- Area served: United States
- Key people: Mike Vranos (CEO)
- AUM: $22 billion (2026)
- Number of employees: ~170 (2026)
- Website: ellington.com

Ellington Management Group is an alternative investment manager with headquarters in Old Greenwich, Connecticut and New York City. Ellington is best known for its focus on securitized assets and other credit instruments, which it manages through hedge funds, private debt funds, long-only vehicles, and separately managed accounts. Affiliates of the firm also manage or advise two publicly-traded companies: Ellington Financial (NYSE:EFC) and Ellington Credit Company (NYSE:EARN). As of March 31, 2026, Ellington and its affiliates managed accounts totaling over $22 billion in assets.

== History ==
The firm was founded in December 1994 by Michael Vranos and five partners with an initial $100 million in funding from Ziff brothers investments. Five of the founding partners previously worked in Kidder, Peabody & Co’s mortgage-backed securities (MBS) trading group, of which Vranos was the senior managing director. Geanakoplos, one of the six founding partners, served as Ellington’s Head of Research and has concurrently held a faculty appointment at Yale University, where he is the James Tobin Professor of Economics. Laurence Penn, previously a managing director and co-head of collateralized mortgage obligation (CMO) origination and trading at Lehman Brothers, joined as a founding partner in 1995. Penn had met Vranos at Harvard, where both men were undergraduate mathematics majors, and they were friends from their freshman year onward.

Vranos had joined Kidder in 1983 after graduating magna cum laude, Phi Beta Kappa, with a degree in mathematics from Harvard University. He rose quickly, becoming a managing director in his twenties, and in 1989 was put in charge of Kidder's mortgage-backed securities desk. Under Vranos, Kidder Peabody became one of the largest participants in the mortgage-backed securities market. From 1990-1994, the firm underwrote more than $200 billion in collaterized mortgage obligations (CMOs), representing about 20% of the total issuance during that period and nearly twice the volume of its closest competitor. By the early 1990s Vranos was consistently ranked among Wall Street's highest-paid traders.

In the aftermath of the Joseph Jett trading scandal, General Electric sold most of Kidder's assets to PaineWebber Group in late 1994; Kidder ceased to exist as an independent firm that December. Following the sale of Kidder Peabody, Vranos chose not to join PaineWebber and instead launched his own firm, Ellington, which was named after Vranos’s hometown of Ellington, Connecticut. Ellington was seeded with $100 million in capital from Ziff Brothers Investments, as well as $10 million of Vranos’s own capital.

In 1996, when the US bond market was down by 2.3%, Ellington posted annualized returns of 40% in the first four months by betting on undervalued mortgage securities. By mid-1996, Ellington managed more than $300 million; Ellington's hedge funds returned about 30% (after fees) in its first year, 50% in 1996, and 20% in 1997.

Ellington was affected by the Long-Term Capital Management debacle in 1998. For a few days in mid-October, the firm sold mortgage securities to lower its funds' leverage. The firm issued a public statement describing its borrowings to quell public fears, which clarified that although it was meeting margin calls by unloading hundreds of millions of dollars in assets over a two-day period, losses were limited. However, from its December 1994 inception through April 2004, the firm delivered a composite annualized return of 15.4%, after fees, weathering both the 1998 crisis and a sharp bond-market selloff in mid-2003.

In November 2002, the independent board of Beacon Hill Asset Management LLC, whose founders had been sued by the U.S. Securities and Exchange Commission for fraud, selected Ellington to take over and liquidate the firm's remaining mortgage-derivative holdings; by 2003 Ellington had finished liquidating the assets, netting $323 million after fees for Beacon Hill's shareholders, roughly 8% more than the portfolio's value when Ellington took over. By 2004 Ellington managed about $3 billion in hedge fund assets.

In July 2007, Ellington formed Ellington Financial to invest primarily in non-agency mortgage-backed securities. The deal was underwritten by Friedman Billings Ramsey and although originally slated for a $750 million offering, evolving market conditions only allowed for a $250 million capital raise. Before the private placement, a New York Times columnist noted that a portion of the private placement might be used to purchase risky tranches from bankrupt subprime lender New Century Financial Corporation and noted the potential difficulty in valuing such instruments. At that time, Ellington’s assets under management included $1.2 billion in a managed account, $5.4 billion in hedge funds and private accounts, and almost $23 billion in collateralized debt obligations.

In October 2007, as the future credit performance of residential mortgages became increasingly uncertain, one Ellington fund was reported to have fallen in value by 22% and to have temporarily suspended redemptions pending greater clarity around valuations.

In October 2010, Ellington Financial went public on the New York Stock Exchange with the ticker "EFC". The IPO was underwritten by Deutsche Bank Securities.

In May 2013, Ellington launched a second public vehicle, Ellington Residential Mortgage REIT (NYSE: EARN), a joint venture with Blackstone Group focused on agency mortgage-backed securities, which raised $129 million in its May 2013 initial public offering. In April 2024 the company changed its name to Ellington Credit Company, and in 2025 it converted from a real estate investment trust into a closed-end fund registered as a regulated investment company, shifting its focus toward collateralized loan obligations. Both Ellington Financial and Ellington Credit Company are externally managed by affiliates of Ellington Management Group, with Laurence Penn serving as chief executive officer of each.

In 2014 an office was opened in London, England in order to expand into the European market. By that time, the firm managed about $6 billion and was expanding its focus to include non-performing loans and commercial real estate credit.

In 2016, Ellington ventured into private credit with the launch of Ellington Private Opportunities, a closed-ended debt fund. In 2019, Ellington launched its first UCITS fund, which was distributed by Franklin K2. In 2022, Ellington expanded its insurance-solutions business to broaden its client base. By June 2023, Ellington’s insurance solutions business had attracted $1.8 billion in funding and commitments.

== Notable funds and investments ==
In an interview with Bloomberg in July 2020, Ellington’s Vranos explained that the firm had put $3 billion to work in non-agency and other mortgage securities since March of that year when the Covid pandemic began. An Ellington residential-mortgage-debt fund returned more than 28% over its lifespan between 2020 and mid-2022. A second iteration of the fund returned 24% between the start of 2023 and January 2024.

== Investment approach ==
Ellington's strategies have historically centered on identifying mortgage- and other asset-backed securities that it believes are mispriced relative to their cash flows, then hedging the resulting interest-rate and other risks using interest rate swaps, Treasury securities, credit default swaps, and other instruments. While the firm initially focused on residential mortgage-backed securities and CMOs, over time the firm has diversified its credit strategies. As of 2026, Ellington managed strategies across residential and commercial mortgages, consumer debt, corporate credit and leveraged loans in U.S. and European markets. Ellington also invested in RMBS and CMBS, corporate CLOs, consumer-loan ABS, mortgage derivatives, residential transition and reverse mortgage loans, and mortgage-related operating companies.

== Publicly-traded investment vehicles ==
Affiliates of Ellington Management Group manage or advise two publicly-traded vehicles: Ellington Financial Inc (NYSE: EFC) and Ellington Credit Company (NYSE: EARN).

Ellington Financial Inc was launched in 2007 as a $250 million private placement, and it made its public debut on the NYSE in October 2010. By October 2021, EFC’s market capitalization exceeded $1 billion, and by August 2026, it exceeded $1.7 billion. From its August 2007 inception through Q1 2026, EFC reported a cumulative economic return of 355.4%, or 8.5% annualized.

In 2014, EFC purchased a stake in Longbridge Financial, a reverse mortgage loan origination and servicing company. In 2016, EFC brought in Home Point Capital, a portfolio company of Stone Point Capital, as an equal partner; EFC repurchased Home Point’s stake in October 2022, making Longbridge a wholly owned subsidiary of EFC. In 2025, Longbridge was the second largest HMBS issuer, with a 23% market share.

In May 2023, EFC announced that it had agreed to acquire Arlington Asset Investment Corp., a mortgage REIT focusing on RMBS investments. The merger closed in December 2023, for a total purchase price of $136 million.

Ellington Credit Company went public on the NYSE in 2013 and converted to a registered closed-end fund focused on investments in collateralized loan obligations in March 2025.

== Philanthropy ==
Ellington Management Group and its founder, Michael Vranos, have been longtime supporters of Help For Children ("HFC"), formerly known as Hedge Funds Care, an international charity dedicated to the prevention and treatment of child maltreatment. Vranos serves on the organization’s Board of Directors and received the organization's Lifetime Award for Caring in 2007. He was responsible for starting HFC Rocks, which is a benefit concert that unites finance professionals to raise millions of dollars for HFC. The first HFC Rocks charity concert took place in 2017 with live performances by the rock bands The Goo Goo Dolls and The Record Company. The HFC Rocks events occur annually, with other notable bands including Joan Jett, Billy Idol, Counting Crows, and Foreigner.
