= Benner's cycle =

1884 chart predicting market cycles

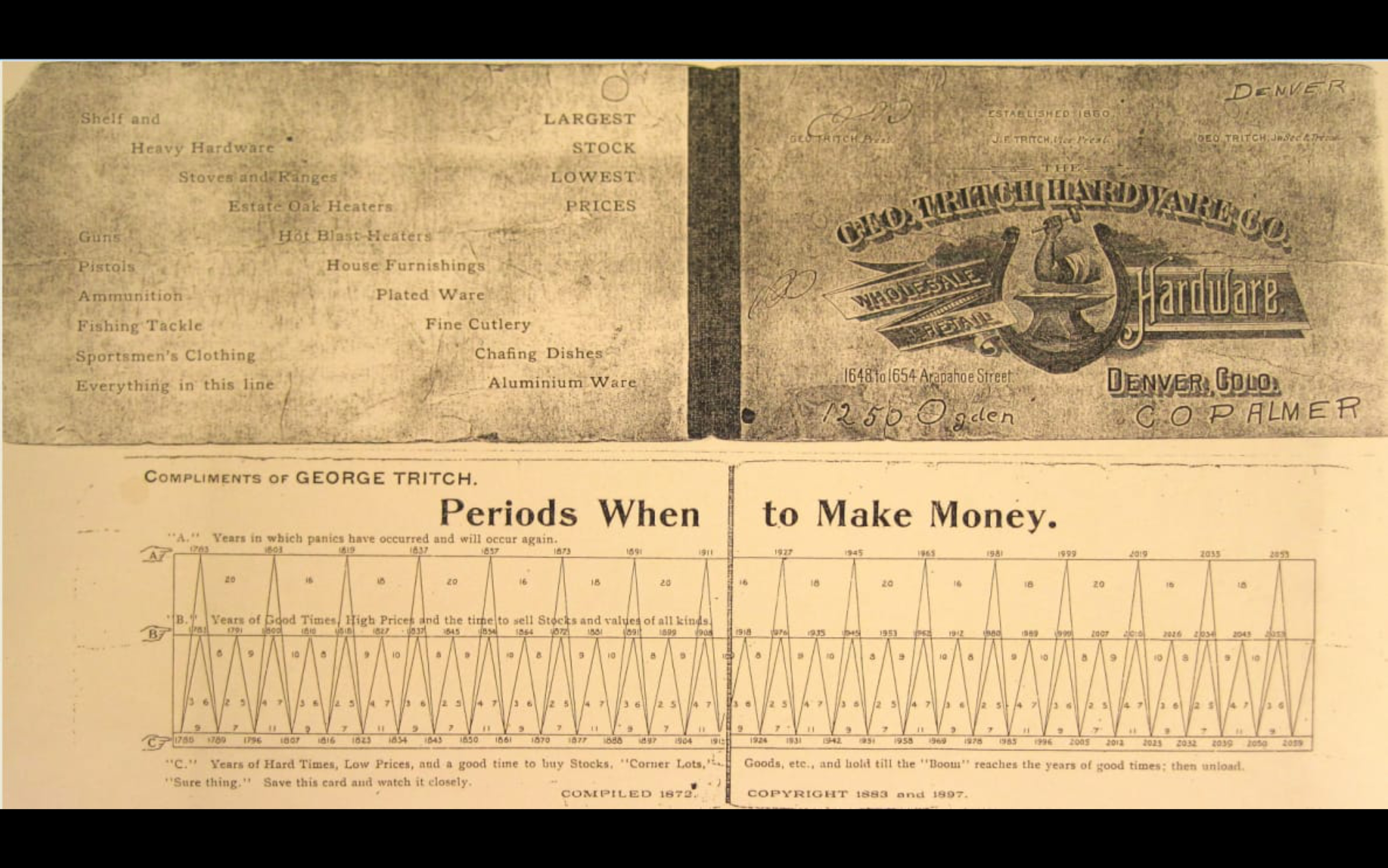
From Benner's Prophecies of Future Ups and Down in Prices (1884), first referenced in 1872.

Benner's cycle describes a theorized economic phenomenon named after an Ohioan accountant, farmer and American Civil War veteran Samuel Benner (1832–1913), who wrote a book entitled Benner's Prophecies of Future Ups and Downs in Prices: What Years to Make Money on Pig-Iron, Hogs, Corn, and Provisions in the late 19th century. The book is based on U.S. government data of market cycles between 1780–1872, which he analyzed to make predictions of market peaks and troughs through 1904, and reprinted in sixteen updated editions until 1907.

The chart marks three phases of market cycles:

- A. Panic Years - "Years in which panic have occurred and will occur again."
- B. Good Times - "Years of Good Times. High prices and the time to sell Stocks and values of all kinds."
- C. "Years of Hard Times, Low Prices, and a good time to buy Stocks, 'Corner Lots', Goods, etc. and hold till the 'Boom' reaches the years of good times; then unload."

== Cycles ==
Benner estimated that panics occur on a cycle of roughly 18 years, 20 years, and 16 years (18-20-16). After a panic, Good Times last for about 7 years. This is followed by a transition of about 11 years to Hard Times. Then, recovery to Good Times over a period of about 9 years (7-11-9).

Predictions
Hard Times	Good Times	Panics
1780		
	1783	1783
1789		
	1791	
1796		
	1800	
		1803
1807		
	1810	
1816		
	1818	
		1819
1823		
	1827	
1834		
	1837	1837
1843		
	1845	
1850		
	1854	
		1857
1861		
	1864	
1870		
	1872	
		1873
1877		
	1881	
1888		
	1891	1891
1897		
	1899	
1904		
	1908	
		1911
1915		
	1918	
1924		
	1926	
		1927
1931		
	1935	
1942		
	1945	1945
1951		
	1953	
1958		
	1962	
		1965
1969		
	1972	
1978		
	1980	
		1981
1985		
	1989	
1996		
	1999	1999
2005		
	2007	
2012		
	2016	
		2019
2023		
	2026	
2032		
	2034	
		2035
2039		
	2043	
2050		
	2053	2053
2059		
