= Credit cycle =

Expansion and contraction of access to credit over time

The credit cycle is the expansion and contraction of access to credit over time. Some economists, including Barry Eichengreen, Hyman Minsky, and other Post-Keynesian economists, as well as members of the Austrian school, regard credit cycles as the fundamental process driving the business cycle. However, mainstream economists believe that the credit cycle cannot fully explain the phenomenon of business cycles, with long term changes in national savings rates, and fiscal and monetary policy, and related multipliers also being important factors. Investor Ray Dalio has counted the credit cycle, together with the debt cycle, the wealth gap cycle and the global geopolitical cycle, among the main forces that drive worldwide shifts in wealth and power.

During an expansion of credit, asset prices are bid up by those with access to leveraged capital. This asset price inflation can then cause an unsustainable speculative price "bubble" to develop. The upswing in new money creation also increases the money supply for real goods and services, thereby stimulating economic activity and fostering growth in national income and employment.

When buyers' funds are exhausted, an asset price decline can occur in the markets which had benefited from the credit expansion. This can then cause insolvency, bankruptcy, and foreclosure for those borrowers who came late to that market. This, in turn, can threaten the solvency and profitability of the banking system itself, resulting in a general contraction of credit as lenders attempt to protect themselves from losses.

== See also ==
- Austrian Business Cycle Theory
- Fractional-reserve banking
- Liquidity trap
- Economic bubble
- Too big to fail
- Zero interest-rate policy (ZIRP)
- Inverted yield curve
- Benner Cycle
