= Leverage cycle =

Expansion and contraction of leverage during the business cycle

Leverage is defined as the ratio of the asset value to the cash needed to purchase it. The leverage cycle can be defined as the procyclical expansion and contraction of leverage over the course of the business cycle. The existence of procyclical leverage amplifies the effect on asset prices over the business cycle.

== Why is leverage significant? ==
Conventional economic theory suggests that interest rates determine the demand and supply of loans. This convention does not take into account the concept of default and hence ignores the need for collateral. When an investor buys an asset, they may use the asset as a collateral and borrow against it, however the investor will not be able to borrow the entire amount. The investor has to finance with their own capital the difference between the value of the collateral and the asset price, known as the margin. Thus the asset becomes leveraged. The need to partially finance the transaction with the investor's own capital implies that their ability to buy assets is limited by their capital at any given time.

Impatient borrowers drive the interest rate higher while nervous lenders demand more collateral, a borrower's willingness to pay a higher interest to ease the concerns of the nervous lender may not necessarily satisfy the lender. Before the 2008 financial crisis, lenders were less nervous. As a result, they were willing to make subprime mortgage loans. Consider an individual who took out a subprime mortgage loan paying a high interest relative to a prime mortgage loan and putting up only 5% collateral, a leverage of 20. During the crisis, lenders become more nervous. As a result, they demand 20% as collateral, even though there is sufficient liquidity in the system. The individual who took out a subprime loan is probably not in a position to buy a house now, regardless of how low the interest rates are. Therefore, in addition to interest rates, collateral requirements should also be taken into consideration in determining the demand and supply of loans.

== How does leverage affect the financial markets? ==
Consider a simple world where there are two types of investors – Individuals and Arbitrageurs. Individual investors have limited investment opportunities in terms of relatively limited access to capital and limited information while sophisticated “arbitrageurs “ (e.g.: dealers, hedge funds, investment banks) have access to better investment opportunities over individual investors due to greater access to capital and better information. Arbitrage opportunities are created when there are differences in asset prices. Individual investors are not able to take advantage of these arbitrage opportunities but arbitrageurs can, due to better information and greater access to capital. Leverage allows arbitrageurs to take on significantly more positions. However, due to margin requirements, even arbitrageurs may potentially face financial constraints and may not be able to completely eliminate the arbitrage opportunities.

The arbitrageur's access to external capital is not only limited but also depends on their wealth. An arbitrageur who is financially constrained, in other words, has exhausted his ability to borrow externally, becomes vulnerable in an economic downturn. In the event of a bad news, the value of the asset falls along with the wealth of the arbitrageur. The leveraged arbitrageurs then face margin calls and are forced to sell assets to meet their respective margin requirements. The flood of asset sales further leads to a loss in asset value and wealth of the arbitrageurs. The increased volatility and uncertainty can then lead to tightening margin requirements causing further forced sales of assets. The resulting change in margins mean that leverage falls. Hence, price falls more than they otherwise would due to the existence of leverage. Therefore, due to the leverage cycle (over-leveraging in good times and de-leveraging in bad times) there exists a situation that can lead to a crash before or even when there is no crash in the fundamentals. This was true in the quant hedge fund crisis in August 2007, where hedge funds hit their capital constraints and had to reduce their positions, at which point prices were driven more by liquidity considerations rather than movement in the fundamentals.

During the 1998 Russian financial crisis, many hedge funds that were engaged in arbitrage strategies experienced heavy losses and had to scale down their positions. The resulting price movements accentuated the losses and triggered further liquidations. Moreover, there was financial contagion, in that price movements in some markets induced price movements in others. These events raised concerns about market disruption and systemic risk, and prompted the Federal Reserve to coordinate the rescue of Long-Term Capital Management.

== Consequences of the leverage cycle ==
A very highly leveraged economy means that a few investors have borrowed a lot of cash from all the lenders in the economy. A higher leverage implies fewer investors and more lenders. Therefore, asset prices in such an economy will be set by only a small group of investors.

According to Tobin's Q, asset prices can affect economic activity. When prices of assets are high, new productive activity can be stimulated that can lead to over production. Alternatively, when asset prices crash, production may come to a standstill. Therefore, the leverage cycle has the potential to amplify real economic activity.

When financially constrained arbitrageurs receive a bad shock, they are forced to shift to low volatility – low margin assets from high volatility - high margin assets, thereby increasing the liquidity risk of already illiquid (risky) assets. This can be categorized as a “flight to quality”.

Broadly speaking market-making arbitrageurs can hold net long positions and as a result capital constraints are more likely to be hit during market downturns. This is likely to result in a sell-off making the markets more illiquid.

Large fluctuations in asset prices in the leverage cycle lead to a huge redistribution of wealth and change in inequality. During a good shock, all optimists become extremely rich relative to lenders thanks to their highly leveraged position while during a bad shock, the optimists are wiped out and the relatively optimistic lenders become rich in the subsequent good shocks.

Highly leveraged agents can potentially become indispensable to the economy if the failure of an extremely leveraged agent increases the likelihood that other leveraged agents will have to follow suit. In other words, high levels of leverage can potentially lead to the “too big to fail” problem.

== Leverage cycle (2007-2009) ==
The leverage cycle crisis of 2007-2009 was particularly significant for a number of reasons. The first and most obvious being that leverage got higher than ever before, and then margins got tighter than ever before.

The subprime losses in 2007-2008 were in the order of several hundred billion dollars, corresponding to only about 5% of overall stock market capitalization. However, since they were primarily borne by levered financial institutions, spiral effects amplified the crisis so the stock market losses amounted to more than 8 trillion dollars.

Credit default swaps (CDS) also played a significant role in the run up to the crisis. The buyer of a CDS is entitled to the principal of the bond in the case of default. A key characteristic of a CDS is that the buyer does not have to hold a bond in order to purchase a CDS. As a result, this financial instrument allowed pessimists to drive asset prices very low. Standardization of CDS facilitated large quantities of trades.

Also during this crisis, a number of real estate properties went “under water”, in other words, the promise to repay exceeded the value of the collateral.

== Welfare implication ==
The highly leveraged arbitrageurs are only concerned about maximizing their own objectives (e.g.: profits) and do not take into consideration the effect their decisions have on asset prices. However, asset prices determine other arbitrageurs’ wealth, and through the financial constraints, arbitrageurs’ ability to invest. As a result, the arbitrageurs’ decisions involve externalities and may not be socially optimal. When arbitrageurs are not financially constrained (their borrowing needs do not exceed the maximum amount they can borrow given their wealth) then they are able to eliminate all arbitrage opportunities. As a result, they perform a socially useful task of reallocating risk by buying risky assets from investors whose valuation is low and selling them to those whose valuation is high. Thus the roles of arbitrageurs are socially optimal when there are no financial constraints. When there are financial constraints, arbitrageurs may not be able to make the socially optimal trades and hence social optimality fails.

== Policy implication ==
A financially constrained firm may need to sell assets substantially below fundamental value due to margin requirements in an industry downturn. This is because the buyers with the highest valuation for the assets are other firms in the same industry who are also likely to be financially constrained and in need of selling assets. During a liquidity crisis, central banks should pursue monetary expansions by increasing liquidity. The results will be most effective when investors are near their financial constraint. If the central bank is better than the market at distinguishing liquidity shocks from fundamental shocks, then the central bank should convey this information to lenders and urge them to relax their funding requirements. Therefore, In order to reduce business cycles the Federal Reserve should manage system wide leverage, limiting leverage in good times and encouraging higher levels of leverage during times of uncertainty, by extending lending facilities.
