= Economic history of Brazil =

Brazil GDP per capita, 1800 to 2018

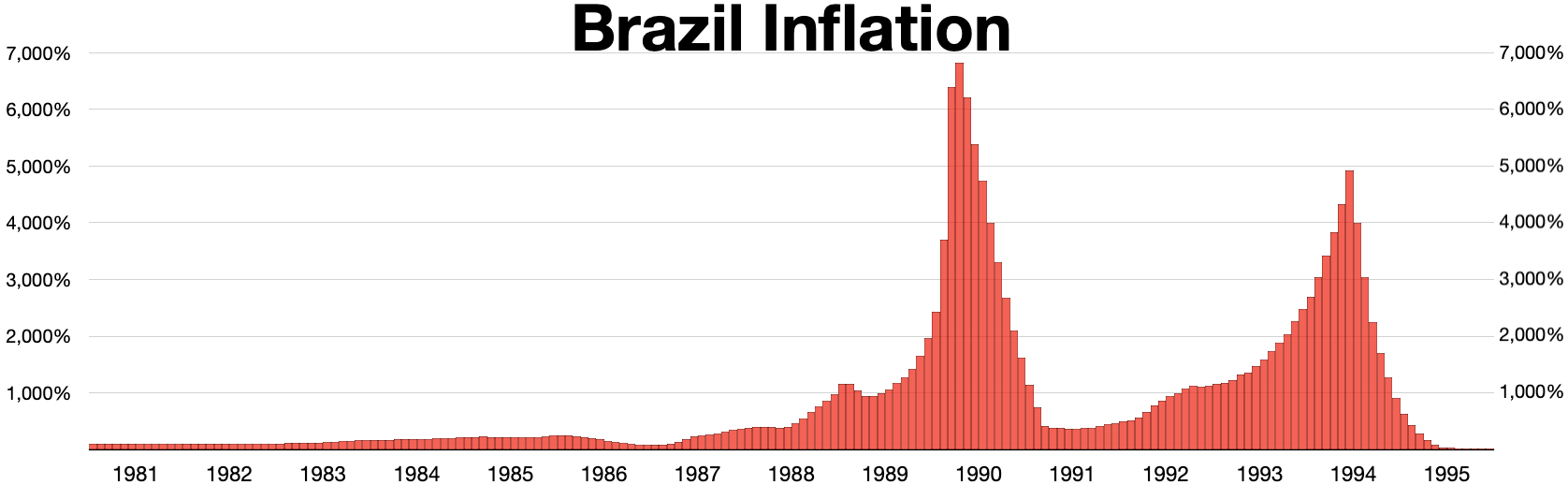
Brazil Inflation 1981-1995

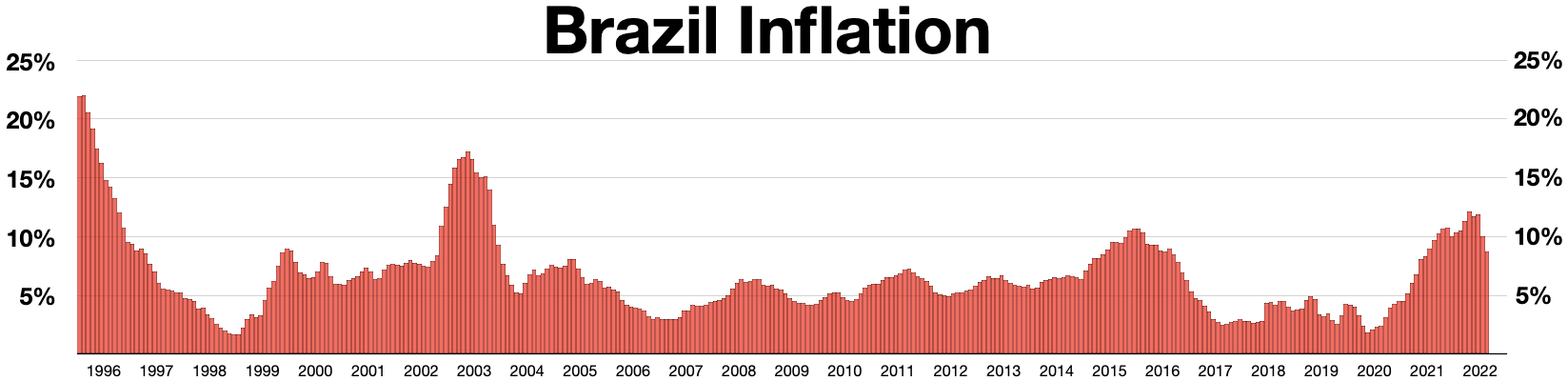
Brazil inflation 1996-2022

The economy of Brazil has changed over the course of the country's history. Portugal, which first colonized the area in the 16th century, enforced a colonial pact with Brazil, an imperial mercantile policy, which drove development for the subsequent three centuries. Independence was achieved in 1822. Slavery was fully abolished in 1888. Important structural transformations began in the 1930s, when important steps were taken to change Brazil into a modern, industrialized economy.

A socioeconomic transformation took place rapidly after World War II. In the 1940s, only 31.3% of Brazil's 41.2 million inhabitants resided in towns and cities. By 1991, of the country's 146.9 million inhabitants 75.5% lived in cities, and Brazil had two of the world's largest metropolitan centers: São Paulo and Rio de Janeiro. The share of the primary sector in the gross national product declined from 28% in 1947 to 11% in 1992. In the same 1947–92 period, the contribution of industry to GNP increased from less than 20–39%. The industrial sector produces a wide range of products for the domestic market and for export, including consumer goods, intermediate goods, and capital goods.

Through the 1980s and 1990s, the Brazilian economy suffered from rampant inflation that subdued economic growth. After several failed economic initiatives created by the government, in 1994 the Plano Real was introduced. This plan brought stability and enabled Brazil to sustain economic growth over that of the global economy through the coming decade. Despite this rapid development the country still suffers from high levels of corruption, violent crime, functional illiteracy and poverty.

== Colonial period ==
Brazil belonged to the Kingdom of Portugal as a colony. European commercial expansion of the fifteenth and sixteenth centuries. Blocked from the lucrative hinterland trade with the Far East, which was dominated by Italian cities, Portugal began in the early fifteenth century to search for other routes to the sources of goods valued in European markets. Portugal discovered the maritime passage to the East Indies around the southern tip of Africa and established a network of trade outposts throughout Africa and Asia. After the discovery of America, it competed with Spain in occupying the New World.

Initially, the Portuguese did not find mineral riches in their American colony, but they never lost the hope of someday finding such riches there. Meanwhile, in order to settle and defend the colony from European intruders, the Portuguese established a pioneer colonial enterprise: the production of sugar in the Northeast. Beginning in about 1532–1534, cattle began arriving in Brazil, and a cattle industry developed rapidly in response to the needs of the sugar industry for transportation and food for workers. The discovery of precious metals in the colony's Center-South (Centro-Sul), a relatively undefined region encompassing the present-day Southeast (Sudeste) and South (Sul) regions, came only in the eighteenth century.

=== Sugar cycle (1540–1640) ===
By the mid-16th century, Portugal had succeeded in establishing a sugar economy in parts of the colony's northeastern coast. Sugar production, the first large-scale colonial agricultural enterprise, was made possible by a series of favorable conditions. Portugal had the agricultural and manufacturing know-how from its Atlantic islands and manufactured its own equipment for extracting sugar from sugarcane. Furthermore, being involved in the African slave trade, it had access to the necessary manpower. Finally, Portugal relied on the commercial skills of the Dutch and financing from Holland to enable a rapid penetration of sugar in Europe's markets.

Until the early seventeenth century, the Portuguese and the Dutch held a virtual monopoly on sugar exports to Europe. However, between 1580 and 1640 Portugal was incorporated into Spain, a country at war with Holland. The Dutch occupied Brazil's sugar area in the Northeast from 1630 to 1654, establishing direct control of the world's sugar supply. When the Dutch were driven out in 1654, they had acquired the technical and organizational know-how for sugar production. Their involvement in the expansion of sugar in the Caribbean contributed to the downfall of the Portuguese monopoly.

The Caribbean sugar boom brought about a steady decline in world sugar prices. Unable to compete, Brazilian sugar exports, which had peaked by the mid-seventeenth century, declined sharply. Between the fourth quarter of the seventeenth century and the early eighteenth century, Portugal had difficulties in maintaining its American colony. The downfall of sugar revealed a fragile colonial economy, which had no commodity to replace sugar. Paradoxically, however, the period of stagnation induced the settlement of substantial portions of the colony's territory. With the decline of sugar, the cattle sector, which had evolved to supply the sugar economy with animals for transport, meat, and hides, assimilated part of the resources made idle, becoming a subsistence economy. Because of extensive cattle production methods, large areas in the colony's interior were settled.

Realizing that it could maintain Brazil only if precious minerals were discovered, Portugal increased its exploratory efforts in the late seventeenth century. As a result, early in the eighteenth century gold and other precious minerals were found. The largest concentration of this gold was in the Southeastern Highlands, mainly in what is now Minas Gerais State.

=== Economy at independence (1822) ===
Despite Brazil's economic troubles, the early nineteenth century was a period of change. First, the Napoleonic Wars forced the Portuguese royal family to flee to Portugal's colony of Brazil in 1808, and for a short period the colony became the seat of the Portuguese empire. Moreover, in 1808 Britain persuaded Portugal to open the colony to trade with the rest of the world, and Portugal rescinded its prohibition against manufacturing (Strangford Treaty). These events paved the way for Brazil's independence on September 7, 1822. Indeed, during this period, the Portuguese royal family and the noblemen who had established themselves in the territory, started many reforms which developed the educational, cultural and economical sectors of Brazil. By 1814, the Portuguese and their allies had defeated Napoleon's armies in the Peninsular War, after had been victorious in the war against the French invasion of Portugal by 1811. However, the King of Portugal remained in Brazil until the Liberal Revolution of 1820, which started in Porto, demanded his return to Lisbon in 1821, but his son Pedro remained in Rio de Janeiro as regent and governor of the newly created Kingdom of Brazil, a Portuguese possession within the new United Kingdom of Portugal, Brazil and the Algarves (1815–22).

Brazil's early years as an independent nation were extremely difficult. 1820-1872 for Brazil was a combination of stagnation and regional diversity. According to Leff (1982, 1997), from the time of Brazil's independence in 1822, its rate of GDP growth failed to outpace its population growth. Hence, while the population did expand at a rapid pace (nearly 2 per cent per annum), the country's efforts to improve its performance in per capita terms were largely frustrating until the start of the twentieth century. This protracted and very difficult period of stagnation was, however, the net results of widely varying trends in different regions of the country. The north-eastern part of Brazil, which was a platform for sugar and cotton exports and which accounted for 57 per cent of the country's exports at the start of this period, saw a steady decline in its external sales. In 1866–70, these crops represented just 30 per cent of exports, while the share of coffee exports-the leading product in the south-eastern portion of the country-jumped from 26 to 47 per cent.

Leff (1982, 1997) explains the decline experiences in the north-east in terms of Dutch disease. As coffee exports came to play a greater role in the foreign exchange market, the real exchange rate increasingly reflected the importance of that product, which had a negative impact on the less competitive regions, such as the north-east. It was neither possible to restructure the sugar industry very quickly, nor easy to promote large-scale inter-regional migration flows, although a large number of slaves did move from the north-east to the south-east. Throughout this period, the expansion of the coffee industry was not hindered by any increase in labor costs, since up to 1852 (end of the slave trade), wages were depressed by the presence of slave labor and later by subsidized immigration flows, particularly from Italy (Leff 1997:5). This strengthened the existing pattern in Brazil: an export sector that generated high levels of earnings alongside a large sector that catered to the domestic market and a large subsistence economy, both with very low levels of productivity, with the outcome being low per capita income levels but a high export coefficient relative to the other Latin American economies. Exports remained low, and the domestic economy was depressed. The only segment that expanded was the subsistence economy. Resources (land, slaves, and transport animals) made idle by the decline of the export economy were absorbed into mostly self-consumption activities.

== American–Brazilian economic relations (1870–1930) ==
In 1870 Brazil's trade with America was valued at about 31 million dollars while the combined trade of all the South American countries was valued at about $29 million. Brazil was a significant producer of coffee and because of this the United States imported about four times as much as it exported to Brazil. In 1885 Brazil was producing more than one half of the world's supply of coffee. Brazil's trade in 1890 was more than $71 million while that of Argentina and Uruguay was $14 million and $6 million respectively. Soon after 1896, the production of coffee started to surpass consumption and prices began to fall in Brazil. Brazil then stored their coffee instead of selling all of it, and when there was bad season of coffee production they would use what they had previously stored from the year before.

The Monroe Doctrine appeared to some South American states as a US attempt of preserving their control over that hemisphere. Brazil viewed this doctrine as a measure of protection against the interference of the US and from European nations. Brazil's first ambassador to the United States, Joaquim Nabuco, 1905–1910, was a partisan of the Monroe Doctrine. Brazil borrowed money from many nations but it was not until after World War One that it actually borrowed substantial amounts from the US. With the outbreak of the First World War, Brazil continued to share the most significant trade with America with a trade that was valued at $154 million.

== Coffee cycle (1840–1930) ==
The impact of coffee on the Brazilian economy was much stronger than that of sugar and gold. When the coffee surge began, Brazil was already free from the limitations of colonialism. Moreover, the substitution of slave labor for wage labor after 1870 (slavery was abolished in 1888) meant an increase in efficiency and the formation of a domestic market for wage goods. Finally, the greater complexity of coffee production and trade established important sectorial linkages within the Brazilian economy.

Coffee was introduced in Brazil early in the eighteenth century, but initially it was planted only for domestic use. It took the high world prices of the late 1820s and early 1830s to turn coffee into a major export item. During the initial phase, production was concentrated in the mountainous region near Rio de Janeiro. This area was highly suitable for coffee cultivation, and it had access to fairly abundant slave labor. Moreover, the coffee could be transported easily on mule trains or on animal-drawn carts over short distances to the ports.

An entrepreneurial class established in Rio de Janeiro during the mining surge was able to induce the government to help create basic conditions for the expansion of coffee, such as removing transportation and labor bottlenecks. From the area near Rio de Janeiro, coffee production moved along the Paraíba Valley toward São Paulo State, which later became Brazil's largest exporting region. Coffee was cultivated with primitive techniques and with no regard to land conservation. Land was abundant, and production could expand easily through the incorporation of new areas. However, it soon became necessary to ease two basic constraints: the lack of transportation and the shortage of labor.

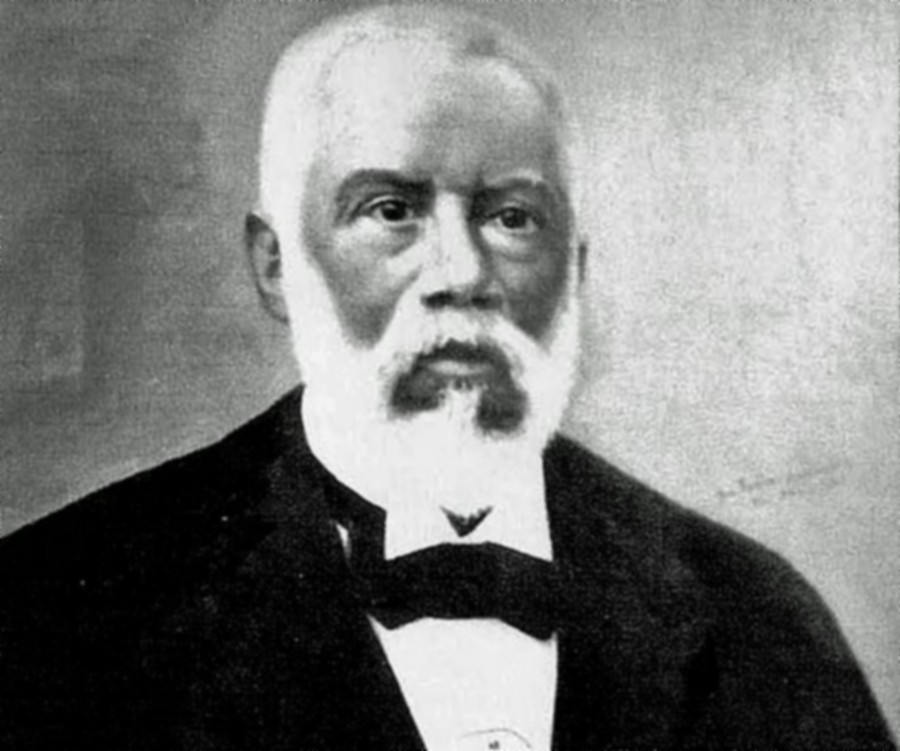
Francisco Paulo de Almeida (1826-1901), first and only Baron of Guaraciaba, title granted by Princess Isabel. Negro, he possessed one of the greatest fortunes of the imperial period, getting to own, on their coffee plantations, approximately one thousand slaves.

The cultivation of coffee farther away from ports required the construction of railroads, first around Rio de Janeiro and into the Paraíba Valley, and later into the fertile highlands of São Paulo. In 1860 Brazil had only 223 kilometers (139 mi) of railroads; by 1885 this total had increased to 6,930 kilometers (4,310 mi). The main rail link between São Paulo's eastern highlands and the ocean port of Santos allowed for a rapid expansion of coffee into the center and northwest of the state.

After the initial coffee expansion, the availability of slaves dwindled, and further cultivation required additional slaves. However, by 1840 Brazil was already under pressure to abolish slavery, and a series of decrees were introduced, making it increasingly difficult to supply the new coffee areas with servile labor. In the 1870s, the shortage of labor became critical, leading to the gradual incorporation of free immigrant labor. The coffee expansion in the west-northwest of São Paulo State after 1880 was made possible largely by immigrant labor. In 1880 São Paulo produced 1.2 million 60-kilogram coffee bags, or 25% of Brazil's total; by 1888 this proportion had jumped to 40% (2.6 million bags); and by 1902, to 60% (8 million bags). In turn, between 1884 and 1890 some 201,000 immigrants had entered São Paulo State, and this total jumped to more than 733,000 between 1891 and 1900. By 1934, over 40% of the coffee production in São Paulo was produced by the 14.5 percent foreign population of the state. International mass immigration to Brazil during the 19th century caused a significant human capital increase because of the immigrants' superior formal and informal education and training. Slavery was abolished in 1888.

The Brazilian economy grew considerably in the second half of the nineteenth century. Coffee was the mainstay of the economy, accounting for 63% of the country's exports in 1891, and 51% between 1901 and 1910. However, sugar, cotton, tobacco, cocoa, and, during the turn-of-the-century rubber boom, rubber were also important. During the first three decades of the 20th century, the Brazilian economy went through periods of growth but also difficulties caused in part by World War I, the Great Depression, and an increasing trend toward coffee overproduction. The four-year gap between the time a coffee tree is planted and the time of the first harvest magnified cyclical fluctuations in coffee prices, which in turn led to the increasing use of government price supports during periods of excess production. The price supports induced an exaggerated expansion of coffee cultivation in São Paulo, culminating in the huge overproduction of the early 1930s.

The 1840 to 1930 period also saw an appreciable but irregular expansion of light industries, notably textiles, clothing, food products, beverages, and tobacco. This expansion was induced by the growth in income, by the availability of foreign exchange, by fiscal policies, and by external events, such as World War I. Other important factors were the expansion of transportation, the installed capacity of electric energy, increased urbanization, and the formation of a dynamic entrepreneurial class. However, the manufacturing growth of the period did not generate significant structural transformations.

Economic growth in the nineteenth century was not shared equally by the regions. Development and growth were concentrated in the Southeast. The South Region also achieved considerable development based on coffee and other agricultural products. The Amazon Basin experienced a meteoric rise and fall of incomes from rubber exports. The Northeast continued to stagnate, with its population living close to the subsistence level.

== Sweeping changes (1930–1945) ==
The decade of the 1930s was a period of interrelated political and economic changes. The decade started with the 1930 revolution, which abolished the Old Republic (1889–1930), a federation of semi-autonomous states. After a transitional period in which centralizing elements struggled with the old oligarchies for control, a coup in 1937 established the New State (Estado Novo) dictatorship (1937–45).

To a large extent, the revolution of 1930 reflected a dissatisfaction with the political control exercised by the old oligarchies. The political unrest of the first half of the 1930s and the 1937 coup were influenced strongly by the onset of economic problems in 1930. The coffee economy suffered from a severe decline in world demand caused by the Great Depression and an excess capacity of coffee production created in the 1920s. As a result, the price of coffee fell sharply and remained at very low levels. Brazil's terms of trade deteriorated significantly. These events, and a large foreign debt, led to an external crisis that took almost a decade to resolve.

The external difficulties had far-reaching consequences. The government was forced to suspend part of the country's debt payments and eventually to impose exchange controls. Excess coffee production led to increasing interventions in the coffee market. The state programs to support coffee prices went bankrupt in 1930. To avoid further decreases in coffee prices, the central government bought huge amounts of coffee, which was then destroyed. Central government intervention provided support to the coffee sector and, through its linkages, to the rest of the economy.

Despite the economic difficulties, the income maintenance scheme of the coffee support program, coupled with the implicit protection provided by the external crisis, was responsible for greater industrial growth. Initially, this growth was based on increased use of the productive capacity and later on moderate spurts of investment. The initial import substitution industrialization that occurred especially during World War I did not lead to industrialization; it became a process of industrialization only in the 1930s.

The 1930s also saw a change in the role of government. Until then, the state acted primarily in response to the demands of the export sector. During the first half of the decade, it was forced to interfere swiftly in an attempt to control the external crisis and to avoid the collapse of the coffee economy; government leaders hoped that the crisis would pass soon and that another export boom would occur. However, with the magnitude and duration of the crisis it became clear that Brazil could no longer rely solely on exports of primary goods and that it was necessary to promote economic diversification. During the Estado Novo, the government made initial attempts at economic planning, and in the late 1930s began to establish the first large government enterprise, an integrated steel mill, Companhia Siderúrgica Nacional.

The World War II period saw mixed achievements. By the late 1930s, coffee production capacity had been reduced drastically, the worst of the external crisis had passed, and the Brazilian economy was ready to grow. However, the war interfered with development efforts. Output increased mainly through better utilization of the existing capacity but, except for the steel mill, there was little industrial and infrastructure investment. Thus, at the end of the war Brazil's industrial capacity was obsolete and the transportation infrastructure was inadequate and badly deteriorated.

== Import substitution industrialization (1945–1964) ==
A review of the evolution and structural changes of the industrial sector since the end of World War II reveals four broad periods. The postwar period to 1962 was a phase of intense import substitution, especially of consumer goods, with basic industries growing at significant but lower rates. The 1968 to 1973 period was one of very rapid industrial expansion and modernization (between 1962 and 1967, the industrial sector stagnated as a result of adverse macroeconomic conditions). The 1974 to 1985 phase was highlighted by import substitution of basic inputs and capital goods and by the expansion of manufactured goods exports. The period since 1987 has been a time of considerable difficulties.

At the end of World War II, political and economic liberalism were reintroduced in Brazil. Getúlio Dorneles Vargas (president, 1930–45, 1951–54) was overthrown, democratic rule was reestablished, and the foreign-exchange reserves accumulated during the war made possible a reduction of trade restrictions. However, trade liberalization was short-lived. The overvalued foreign-exchange rate, established in 1945, remained fixed until 1953. This, combined with persistent inflation and a repressed demand, meant sharp increases in imports and a sluggish performance of exports, which soon led again to a balance of payments crisis.

Pessimistic about the future of Brazil's exports, the government feared that the crisis would have a negative impact on inflation. Consequently, instead of devaluing the cruzeiro, it decided to deal with the crisis through exchange controls. In 1951 the newly elected government of Getúlio Vargas enforced a recently established system of import licensing, giving priority to imports of essential goods and inputs (fuels and machinery) and discouraging imports of consumer goods. These policies had the unanticipated effect of providing protection to the consumer goods industry. Early in the 1950s, however, convinced that the only hope for rapid growth was to change the structure of the Brazilian economy, the government adopted an explicit policy of import substitution industrialization. An important instrument of this policy was the use of foreign exchange controls to protect selected segments of domestic industry and to facilitate the importation of equipment and inputs for them.

However, the move to fixed exchange rates together with import licensing drastically curtailed exports, and the balance of payments problem became acute. The system became nearly unmanageable, and in 1953 a more flexible, multiple-exchange-rate system was introduced. Under the latter, imports considered essential were brought in at a favored rate; imports of goods that could be supplied domestically faced high rates and were allotted small portions of the available foreign exchange. Similarly, some exports were stimulated with a higher exchange rate than those of traditional exports. This system continued to be the main instrument for the promotion of import substitution industrialization, but the performance of the export sector improved only modestly.

Between 1957 and 1961, the government made several changes in the exchange-control system, most of which were attempts at reducing its awkwardness or at improving its performance with the advance of import substitution industrialization. For this same purpose, the government also introduced several complementary measures, including enacting the Tariff Law of 1957, increasing and solidifying the protection extended to domestic industries, and offering strong inducements to direct foreign investment.

In the second half of the 1950s, the government enacted a series of special programs intended to better orient the industrialization process, to remove bottlenecks, and to promote vertical integration in certain industries. The government gave special attention to industries considered basic for growth, notably the automotive, cement, steel, aluminum, cellulose, heavy machinery, and chemical industries.

As a result of import substitution industrialization, the Brazilian economy experienced rapid growth and considerable diversification. Between 1950 and 1961, the average annual rate of growth of the gross domestic product exceeded 7%. Industry was the engine of growth. It had an average annual growth rate of over 9 percent between 1950 and 1961, compared with 4.5% for agriculture. In addition, the structure of the manufacturing sector experienced considerable change. Traditional industries, such as textiles, food products, and clothing, declined, while the transport equipment, machinery, electric equipment and appliances, and chemical industries expanded.

However, the strategy also left a legacy of problems and distortions. The growth it promoted resulted in a substantial increase in imports, notably of inputs and machinery, and the foreign-exchange policies of the period meant inadequate export growth. Moreover, a large influx of foreign capital in the 1950s resulted in a large foreign debt.

Import substitution industrialization can be assessed according to the contribution to value added by four main industrial subsectors: nondurable consumer goods, durable consumer goods, intermediate goods, and capital goods. Using data from the industrial censuses, the share of these groups in value added between 1949 and 1960 shows a considerable decline in the share of the nondurable goods industries, from nearly 60 percent to less than 43 percent, and a sharp increase in that of durable goods, from nearly 6% to more than 18%. The intermediate and capital goods groups experienced moderate increases, from 32 to 36% and from 2.2 to 3.2%, respectively.

A representative component of the nondurable group is the textile industry, the leading sector before World War II. Between 1949 and 1960, its share in the value added by industry as a whole experienced a sharp decline, from 20.1% to 11.6%. In the durable goods group, the component with the most significant change was the transport equipment sector (automobiles and trucks), which increased from 2.3% to 10.5%.

The lower increases in the shares of the intermediate and capital goods industries reflect the lesser priority attributed to them by the import substitution industrialization strategy. In the early 1960s, Brazil already had a fairly diversified industrial structure, but one in which vertical integration was only beginning. Thus, instead of alleviating the balance of payments problems, import substitution increased them dramatically.

== Stagnation, spectacular growth, inequality (1962–1980) ==
=== Stagnation (1962–1967) ===
As a result of the problems associated with import substitution industrialization and the reforms introduced by the military regime after March 1964, the Brazilian economy lost much of its dynamism between 1962 and 1967. The average rate of growth of GDP in the period declined to 4.0 percent and that of industry to 3.9 percent. In part, stagnation resulted from distortions caused by the strategy. Moreover, political troubles negatively affected expectations and precluded the formation of a coalition to back the introduction of tough measures to control inflation and the balance of payments crisis. Political troubles also hindered the removal of obstacles to growth.

The 1964 coup dealt with the political obstacles by forcefully restraining opposition to the military agenda of change. With the objective of transforming Brazil into a modern capitalist economy and a military power, the regime implemented a series of reforms aimed at reducing inflation, at removing some of the distortions of import substitution industrialization, and at modernizing capital markets. The regime gradually introduced incentives to direct investment, domestic and foreign, and tackled balance of payments problems by reforming and simplifying the foreign-exchange system. In addition, the regime introduced a mechanism of periodic devaluations of the cruzeiro, taking into account inflation. Finally, the military government adopted measures to attract foreign capital and to promote exports. It took steps to expand public investment to improve the country's infrastructure and later to develop state-owned basic industries.

=== Spectacular growth (1968–1973) ===
The post-1964 reforms and other policies of the military government, together with the state of the world economy, created conditions for very rapid growth between 1968 and 1973. In that period, the average annual rate of growth of GDP jumped to 11.1%, led by industry with a 13.1% average. Within industry, the leading sectors were consumer durables, transportation equipment, and basic industries, such as steel, cement, and electricity generation.

As a result of the post-1964 policies, external trade expanded substantially faster than the economy as a whole. There was a significant growth in exports, especially manufactured goods, but also commodities. Yet, imports grew considerably faster, rapidly increasing the trade deficit. This did not present a problem, however, because massive inflows of capital resulted in balance of payments surpluses.

The external sector contributed substantially to high growth rates, as did the rapid expansion of investment, including a growing share of public investment and investment by state-controlled enterprises. In addition, increased demand for automobiles, durable and luxury goods, and housing resulted from a rapid growth in income for the upper income strata and from credit plans created for consumers and home-buyers by the capital-market reforms.

The industrial sector generally experienced not only rapid growth but also considerable modernization. As a result, imports of capital goods and basic and semi-processed inputs increased sharply. The share of intermediate goods imports in total imports increased from 31.0% in the 1960–62 period to 42.7% in 1972, and that of capital goods, from 29.0 to 42.2%. The total value of imports rose from US$1.3 billion to US$4.4 billion.

A comparison of the 1960 and the 1975 shares of the various industrial sectors in total value added by industry reveals a continuation in the relative decline of nondurable industries, notably textiles, food products, and beverages, and an increase in machinery, from 3.2 to 10.3%. The relative shares of most of the remaining industries, however, did not change significantly in the period.

As a result of the period's outward-looking development strategy, Brazil's industrial exports increased from US$1.4 billion in 1963 to US$6.2 billion in 1973. The composition of exports shows that whereas in 1963 processed and semi-processed manufactured exports accounted for only 5% of total exports, in 1974 their share had reached 29%.

In the 1968–73 period, personal income became more concentrated and regional disparities became greater. Industrial expansion took place more vigorously in the Center-South Region, which had benefited most from the import substitution industrialization strategy. Its per-capita income considerably exceeded the national average, its infrastructure was more developed, and it had an adequate supply of skilled workers and professionals. The region was therefore able to take advantage of the opportunities and incentives offered by the military regime. Although a special regional development strategy existed for the Northeast, it promoted a distorted industrialization that benefited only a few of that region's large cities; the Northeast's linkages with the Center-South were stronger than its linkages within the region. The combination of a harsh climate, a highly concentrated land-tenure system, and an elite that consistently resisted meaningful change prevented the Northeast from developing effectively.

=== Growth with debt (1974–1980) ===
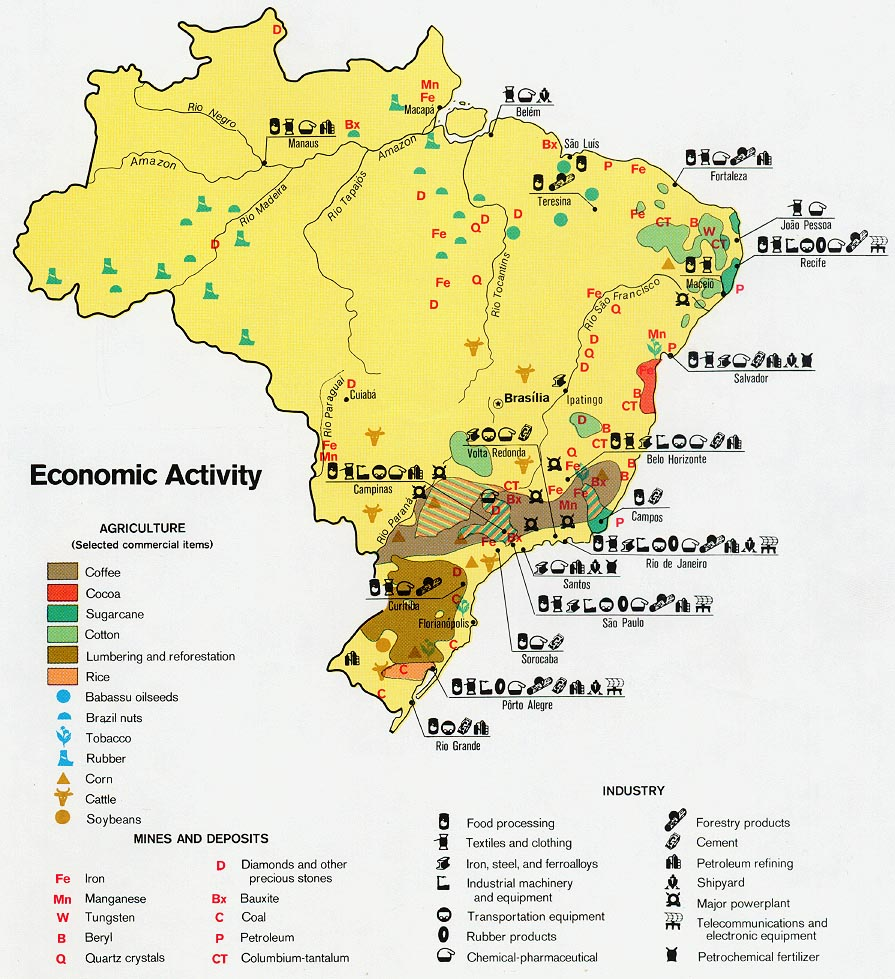
Economic activity in Brazil (1977)

Brazil suffered drastic reductions in its terms of trade as a result of the 1973 oil shock. In the early 1970s, the performance of the export sector was undermined by an overvalued currency. With the trade balance under pressure, the oil shock led to a sharply higher import bill. Brazil opted to continue a high-growth policy. Furthermore, it adopted renewed strategies of import substitution industrialization and of economic diversification. In the mid-1970s, the regime began implementing a development plan aimed at increasing self-sufficiency in many sectors and creating new comparative advantages. Its main components were to promote import substitution of basic industrial inputs (steel, aluminium, fertilizers, petrochemicals), to make large investments in the expansion of the economic infrastructure, and to promote exports.

This strategy was effective in promoting growth, but it also raised Brazil's import requirements markedly, increasing the already large current-account deficit. The current account was financed by running up the foreign debt. The expectation was that the combined effects of import substitution industrialization and export expansion eventually would bring about growing trade surpluses, allowing the service and repayment of the foreign debt.

Thus, despite the world recession resulting from other countries' adjustments to the oil shock, Brazil was able to maintain a high growth rate. Between 1974 and 1980, the average annual rate of growth of real GDP reached 6.9 percent and that of industry, 7.2 percent. However, the current-account deficit increased from US$1.7 billion in 1973 to US$12.8 billion in 1980. The foreign debt rose from US$6.4 billion in 1963 to nearly US$54 billion in 1980.

Brazil was able to raise its foreign debt because, at the time, the international financial system was awash in petrodollars and was eagerly offering low-interest loans. By the end of the 1970s, however, the foreign debt had reached high levels. Additionally, the marked increase of international interest rates raised the debt service, forcing the country to borrow more only to meet interest payments. Productive capacity, exports, and the substitution of imports in various sectors expanded and became more diversified. However, the expected impacts on Brazil's current account were not to materialize until the mid-1980s.

Another feature of the 1974–80 period was an acceleration of inflation. Between 1968 and 1974, the rate of inflation had declined steadily, but afterward the trend was reversed. From 16.2 percent a year in 1973, the growth rate of the general price index increased to 110.2 percent a year by 1980.

== Stagnation, inflation and crisis (1981–1993) ==
The effect of the 1974–85 period's industrialization on the balance of trade was significant. The balance of trade moved from an average deficit of US$3.4 billion in the 1974–76 period to an average surplus of US$10.7 billion in the 1983–85 period. In 1985 the share of manufactures (processed and semi-processed) of total exports reached 66 percent, and between 1971–75 and 1978–83 the share of basic input imports in total imports declined from 32.3% to 19.2%. The recession and stagnation of the early 1980s had a role in reducing imports. However, import substitution was also important, as demonstrated by the few years of the 1980s that experienced a significant growth in GDP while the trade surplus was maintained.

Between 1981 and 1992, the GDP increased at an average annual rate of only 2.9% and per capita income declined 6%. Gross investment, as a proportion of GDP, fell from 21 to 16 percent, in part as a result of the fiscal crisis and the loss of public-sector investment capacity. The decline also reflected growing uncertainties regarding the future of the economy. The 1980s became known as the "lost decade," and its problems spilled over into the 1990s. Despite the stagnation of the 1981–92 period, inflation remained a major problem (see stagflation). It stayed in the 100% level until the mid-80's and then grew to more than 1000% a year, reaching a record 2000% in 1993."Macrotrends".

=== 1981–1984 ===
In 1979 a second oil shock nearly doubled the price of imported oil to Brazil and lowered the terms of trade further. The rise in world interest rates sharply increased Brazil's balance of payments problem and the size of the foreign debt. Nevertheless, the government continued borrowing, mainly to face an increasing debt burden, while it tried vainly to maintain the high-growth strategy. At the beginning of the 1980s, however, the foreign-debt problem became acute, leading to the introduction of a program to generate growing trade surpluses in order to service the foreign debt. The program was achieved by reducing growth and, with it, imports, and by expanding exports. As a result, in 1981 real GDP declined by 4.4 percent. The 1982 Mexican debt crisis ended Brazil's access to international financial markets, increasing the pressure for economic adjustment.

Some unorthodox economists like Stephen Kanitz attribute the debt crisis not to the high Brazilian level of indebtedness nor to the disorganization of the country's economy. They say that the cause of the crisis was rather a minor error in the U.S. government banking regulations which forbids its banks from lending over ten times the amount of their capital, a regulation that, when the inflation eroded their lending limits, forced them to cut the access of underdeveloped countries to international savings.

The austerity program imposed by the International Monetary Fund in late 1979 continued until 1984, but substantial trade surpluses were obtained only from 1983 on, largely as a delayed result of the import substitution industrialization programs of the 1970s and the reduction in imports brought about by economic decline. The austerity program enabled Brazil to meet interest payments on the debt, but at the price of economic decline and increasing inflation.

Inflation accelerated as a result of a combination of factors: the exchange-rate devaluations of the austerity program, a growing public deficit, and an increasing indexation of financial balances, wages, and other values for inflation. The first two factors are classical causes of inflation; the last became an important mechanism for propagating hyperinflation and in preventing the usual instruments of inflation control from operating.

By the mid-1980s, domestic debt nearly displaced foreign debt as Brazil's main economic problem. During the high-growth 1970s, a significant portion of foreign borrowing had been by state enterprises, which were the main actors in the import substitution industrialization strategy. Initially, they borrowed to finance their investments. However, toward the end of the decade, with the acute shortage of foreign exchange, the government forced state enterprises to borrow unnecessarily, increasing their indebtedness markedly. Their situation worsened with the sharp rise in international interest rates in the late 1970s, the devaluations of the austerity program, and the decreasing real prices of goods and services provided by the public enterprises stemming from price controls. Because the state enterprises were not allowed to go bankrupt, their debt burden was transferred gradually to the government, further increasing the public debt. This, and a growing disorganization of the public sector, transformed the public debt into a major economic problem. By the mid-1980s, the financial burden stemming from the debt was contributing decisively to its rapid expansion.

=== 1985–1989 ===
During the second half of the 1980s, it became increasingly clear that a large-scale fiscal reform, one that enabled noninflationary financing of the public sector, was needed not only to control inflation but also to restore the public sector's capacity to invest. Both were essential for an economic recovery. However, political obstacles prevented the reform from materializing. And, because inflation had become the most visible symptom of the public-sector disequilibrium, there were several attempts to bring inflation under control through what came to be known as "heterodox economic shocks". The period saw three such shocks: the Cruzado Plan (1986), the Bresser Plan (1987), and the Summer Plan (1989).

The objective of the Cruzado Plan was to eliminate inflation with a dramatic blow. Between 1980 and 1985, the rise in the CPI had escalated from 86.3% to 248.5% annually. Early in 1986, the situation became desperate, prodding the implementation of the plan. Its main measures were a general price freeze, a wage readjustment and freeze, readjustment and freeze on rents and mortgage payments, a ban on indexation, and a freeze on the exchange rate.

The plan's immediate results were spectacular: the monthly rate of inflation fell close to zero, economic growth surged upward, and the foreign accounts remained under control. However, by the end of 1986 the plan was in trouble. The wage adjustments were too large, increasing aggregate demand excessively and creating inflationary pressures. Moreover, the price freeze was maintained for too long, creating distortions and leading to shortages of a growing number of products. Inflation accelerated again and there was a return of indexation. The country imposed a moratorium on its foreign debt service on February 20, 1987.

The two other stabilization plans amounted to renewed attempts at bringing inflation down from very high levels. It was soon clear that without a thorough reform of the public sector, controlling inflation would be impossible. Both plans introduced a price freeze and eliminated indexation, but there were differences between them, and with the Cruzado Plan. Neither was able to address the public-sector disequilibrium effectively. The objective of the Summer Plan, for instance, was mainly to avoid hyperinflation in an election year.

In fact, the public-sector disequilibrium became virtually locked in as a result of the 1988 constitution, which created advantages for various segments of society without indicating how these advantages would be paid for. Moreover, it transferred large portions of the tax revenues from the federal government to state and municipal governments, without requiring them to provide additional public services. With less revenue and more responsibility, the federal accounts experienced growing deficits. In addition, several subsidies were locked into the legislation. These factors and the financial burden of the public debt meant growing problems of public finance.

The 1980s ended with high and accelerating inflation and a stagnant economy, which never recovered after the demise of the Cruzado Plan. The public debt was enormous, and the government was required to pay very high interest rates to persuade the public to continue to buy government debt instruments.

Another major obstacle to economic growth during the 1980s was Brazil's protectionist policy from 1984 to 1992 of severely restricting imports of foreign computer hardware and software to protect and nurture Brazil's domestic computer industry (which was but one manifestation of the country's long-term policy of import substitution industrialization). The policy was so strict that the government regularly seized personal computers from foreign businesspersons who were visiting for ordinary business trips, because of the fear that foreign visitors were smuggling PCs to domestic users. Although this policy was superficially successful, the federal government failed to fund the basic research that was essential to the success of computer industries in the United States, Europe, and Japan. Brazilian computer users in this era frequently paid two or three times the international market price for unreliable, poorly designed domestic clones of foreign computer designs, since domestic manufacturers lacked the well-trained engineers and basic research necessary to develop their own indigenous innovations, let alone build brilliant new designs from scratch. By the time the policy was rescinded in 1991, it had failed in the sense that Brazil's domestic computer manufacturers were still unable to make advanced computer products suitable for export to other countries, and had severely limited the modernization and computerization of Brazil's economy. By that point in time, computer usage in most economic sectors in most developed countries was exceeding 90 percent. In Brazil, computer usage by businesses was around 12 percent. Even worse, Brazilian schools were falling far behind in preparing students to use computers when they entered the workforce; only 0.5 percent of Brazilian classrooms had computers. In other words, by 1990, the electronic office was still science fiction as far as most Brazilians were concerned and they were still doing business exclusively through labor-intensive paper-based processes. This meant their productivity was far lower than people in countries who had already been using computers for one or two decades, and who had, for example, already made the transition from typing and re-typing drafts of documents on manual typewriters to simply entering print commands into word processing software. Finally, the policy of restricting imports of foreign computers was also blamed for causing Brazil to fall far behind in adopting many lifesaving technologies made possible by modern microprocessors, such as anti-lock brakes.

=== 1990–1993 ===
The first post-military-regime president elected by popular suffrage, Fernando Collor de Mello (1990–92), was sworn into office in March 1990. Facing imminent hyperinflation and a virtually bankrupt public sector, the new administration introduced a stabilization plan, together with a set of reforms, aimed at removing restrictions on free enterprise, increasing competition, privatizing public enterprises, and boosting productivity.

Heralded as a definitive blow to inflation, the stabilization plan was drastic. It imposed an eighteen-month freeze on all but a small portion of the private sector's financial assets, froze prices, and again abolished indexation. The new administration also introduced provisional taxes to deal with the fiscal crisis, and took steps to reform the public sector by closing several public agencies and dismissing public servants. These measures were expected not only to swiftly reduce inflation but also to lower inflationary expectations. Collor also implemented a radical liquidity freeze, reducing the money stock by 80% by freezing bank accounts in excess of $1000.

Brazil adopted neoliberalism in the late 1980s, with support from the workers party on the left. Brazil ended the old policy of closed economies with development focused through import substitution industrialization, in favor of a more open economic system and privatization. For example, tariff rates were cut from 32 percent in 1990 to 14 percent in 1994. The market reforms and trade reforms resulted in price stability and faster inflow of capital, but did not change levels of income inequality and poverty.

At first few of the new administration's programs succeeded. Major difficulties with the stabilization and reform programs were caused in part by the superficial nature of many of the administration's actions and by its inability to secure political support. Moreover, the stabilization plan failed because of management errors coupled with defensive actions by segments of society that would be most directly hurt by the plan. Confidence in the government was also eroded as a result of the liquidity freeze combined with an alienated industrial sector who had not been consulted in the plan.

After falling more than 80 percent in March 1990, the CPI's monthly rate of growth began increasing again. The best that could be achieved was to stabilize the CPI at a high and slowly rising level. In January 1991, it rose by 19.9%, reaching 32% a month by July 1993. Simultaneously, political instability increased sharply, with negative impacts on the economy. The real GDP declined 4.0% in 1990, increased only 1.1% in 1991, and again declined 0.9% in 1992.

President Collor de Mello was impeached in September 1992 on charges of corruption. Vice president Itamar Franco was sworn in as president (1992–94), but he had to grapple to form a stable cabinet and to gather political support. The weakness of the interim administration prevented it from tackling inflation effectively. In 1993 the economy grew again, but with inflation rates higher than 30 percent a month, the chances of a durable recovery appeared to be very slim. At the end of the year, it was widely acknowledged that without serious fiscal reform, inflation would remain high and the economy would not sustain growth. This acknowledgment and the pressure of rapidly accelerating inflation finally jolted the government into action. The president appointed a determined minister of finance, Fernando Henrique Cardoso, and a high-level team was put in place to develop a new stabilization plan. Implemented early in 1994, the plan met little public resistance because it was discussed widely and it avoided price freezes.

The stabilization program, called Plano Real had three stages: the introduction of an equilibrium budget mandated by the National Congress a process of general indexation (prices, wages, taxes, contracts, and financial assets); and the introduction of a new currency, the Brazilian real (pegged to the dollar). The legally enforced balanced budget would remove expectations regarding inflationary behavior by the public sector. By allowing a realignment of relative prices, general indexation would pave the way for monetary reform. Once this realignment was achieved, the new currency would be introduced, accompanied by appropriate policies (especially the control of expenditures through high interest rates and the liberalization of trade to increase competition and thus prevent speculative behavior).

By the end of the first quarter of 1994, the second stage of the stabilization plan was being implemented. Economists of different schools of thought considered the plan sound and technically consistent.

== Post-Real Plan economy (1994–2010) ==
The Plano Real ("Real Plan"), instituted in the spring 1994, sought to break inflationary expectations by pegging the real to the US dollar. Inflation was brought down to single digit annual figures, but not fast enough to avoid substantial real exchange rate appreciation during the transition phase of the Plano Real. This appreciation meant that Brazilian goods were now more expensive relative to goods from other countries, which contributed to large current account deficits. However, no shortage of foreign currency ensued because of the financial community's renewed interest in Brazilian markets as inflation rates stabilized and memories of the debt crisis of the 1980s faded.

The Real Plan successfully eliminated inflation, after many failed attempts to control it. Almost 25 million people turned into consumers.

The maintenance of large current account deficits via financial account surpluses became problematic as investors became more risk averse to emerging market exposure as a consequence of the Asian financial crisis in 1997 and the Russian bond default in August 1998. After crafting a fiscal adjustment program and pledging progress on structural reform, Brazil received a $41.5 billion IMF-led international support program in November 1998. In January 1999, the Brazilian Central Bank announced that the real would no longer be pegged to the US dollar. This devaluation helped moderate the downturn in economic growth in 1999 that investors had expressed concerns about over the summer of 1998. Brazil's debt-to-GDP ratio of 48% for 1999 beat the IMF target and helped reassure investors that Brazil will maintain tight fiscal and monetary policy even with a floating currency.

The economy grew 4.4% in 2000, but problems in Argentina in 2001, and growing concerns that the presidential candidate considered most likely to win, leftist Luiz Inácio Lula da Silva, would default on the debt, triggered a confidence crisis that caused the economy to decelerate. Poverty was down to near 16%.

In 2002, Luiz Inácio Lula da Silva won the presidential elections and was re-elected in 2006. During his government, the economy began to grow more rapidly. In 2004, Brazil saw a promising growth of 5.7% in GDP, followed by 2005 with 3.2%, 2006 with 4.0%, 2007 with 6.1% and 2008 with 5.1%. Due to the 2008–10 world financial crisis, Brazil's economy was expected to slow down in 2009 between a decline of −0.5% and a growth of 0.0%. In reality, economic growth continued at a high rate hitting 7.5% in 2010.

=== 2010s economic contraction ===
Following a boom at the end of the previous decade, Brazil's economy experienced a contraction. Between 2011 and 2015, the value of the real fell from 1.55 reals per US dollar to 4.0 reals. The price of many of the country's main exports fell due to falling demand. From September 2014 to February 2015, Petrobras, the largest energy corporation in Brazil, lost 60% of its market value. Unemployment remained below 6% but began to rise above that in 2015 with the economy overall expected to contract by 25% in 2015 in US dollar terms.

=== 2020s ===
Brazil is the world’s fifth-largest country and Latin America’s largest economy. During the tenure of right-wing President Jair Bolsonaro (from 1 January 2019 to 31 December 2022) there were privatization reforms in Brazil, including plans to privatize the state oil company. In October 2022 election, former President Luiz Inacio “Lula” Da Silva of the leftist Worker’s Party (PT), won incumbent president Bolsonaro, whose privatization reforms are expected to become reversed. However, the center-right opposition still held a large congressional plurality.

== See also ==
- Economy of Brazil
- History of Brazil's economic policy
- List of economic crises in Brazil
- Agriculture in Brazil
- Industrialization in Brazil
- Latin American debt crisis
- La Década Perdida (The Lost Decade)
- Economic history of Latin America
- Inflation indexes in Brazil

== Works cited ==
- Hudson, Rex A., ed. (1998). Brazil: a country study (5th ed.). Washington, D.C.: Federal Research Division, Library of Congress. ISBN 0-8444-0854-9. OCLC 37588455. This article incorporates text from this source, which is in the public domain.
