= Prova Paulista =

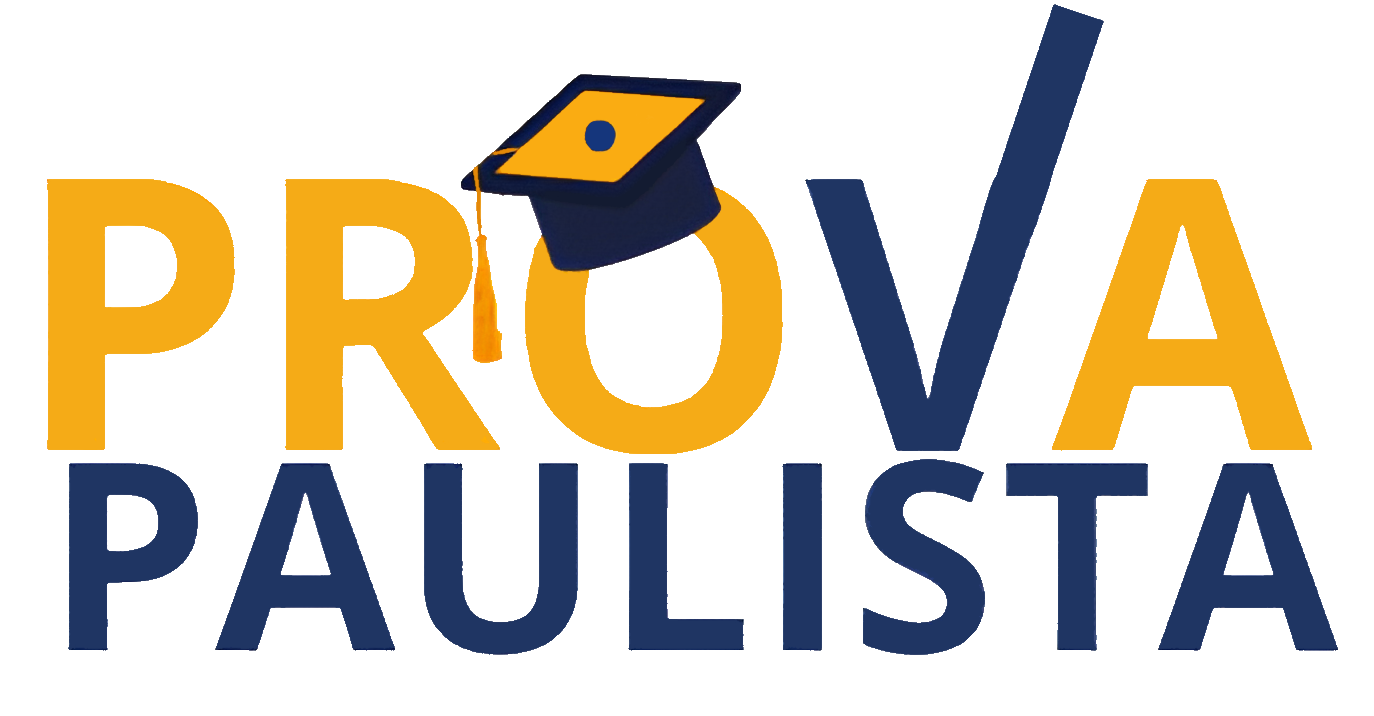
- Current logo of Prova Paulista
- Type: Digital bimonthly exam
- Administrator: São Paulo State Department of Education (SEDUC-SP)
- Skills tested: Portuguese Language, Mathematics, Human Sciences, Natural Sciences, English Language, Financial Education and Formation Itinerary
- Purpose: Evaluate the performance of students in the São Paulo state network based on the knowledge acquired over the two months
- Year started: March 28, 2023
- Duration: 2 days
- Score range: It varies from 30 to 45 per test, depending on the level of education
- Regions: Brazil ( (São Paulo (state)) São Paulo)
- Languages: Portuguese (original) and English (interface only)
- Website: cmspweb.ip.tv

Prova Paulista (Paulista Exam) is a platform of the São Paulo Media Center (CMSP) and a standardized digital assessment administered to students in state schools of São Paulo state, Brazil. The test is designed for students from the 5th year of elementary school (ensino fundamental) to the 3rd year of high school (ensino médio) and succeeded the Assessment of Learning in Process (AAP). The Prova Paulista is held every scholar term (bimester), corresponding to the four-term academic calendar used by state schools.

== Structure and Components ==
The Prova Paulista encompasses a broad range of curricular components, excluding Arts and Physical Education. The assessment is divided into two main days, each focusing on different subjects:

Day 1:

- Portuguese Language
- Human Sciences
- Geography
- Financial Education (included only in high school)
- Formation Itinerary (included only in high school)

Day 2:

- Mathematics
- English Language (included for students in the 6th to 9th years of elementary school and the 1st year of high school)
- Sciences
- Formation Itinerary (for 2nd and 3rd years of high school)

=== Score system ===
The Prova Paulista tests students on knowledge acquired through Digital Material throughout the bimester. The scoring system for the assessment is straightforward, with each question worth one point. The number of questions varies by educational level:

- 5th Year of Elementary School: 30 questions per day
- 6th to 9th Years of Elementary School: 40 questions per day
- High School: 45 questions per day

The overall score is determined by the total number of correctly answered questions.

== Implementation ==
The first Prova Paulista assessment period was conducted between March 28 and April 13, 2023. The testing schedule progressed in ascending order, starting with the 5th year of elementary school and concluding with the 3rd year of high school.
