= CMSP =

CMSP may refer to:

- China Manned Space Program, officially abbreviated as CMS
- Companhia do Metropolitano de São Paulo, a company responsible for administering the São Paulo Metro
- Municipal Chamber of São Paulo, the unicameral legislature for the city of São Paulo
- São Paulo Media Center, a former educational web portal
