= Supply and Demand (disambiguation) =

Supply and demand is an economic model used to explain price changes in a market.

- See also Capitalism#Supply and demand.

Supply and Demand may also refer to:

- Supply and Demand (Dagmar Krause album)
- Supply and Demand (Amos Lee album) or the title song
- Supply & Demand (Playaz Circle album)
- "Supply and Demand", a song by the Hives from the 2002 album Veni Vidi Vicious
- "Supply & Demand" (TV series), an ITV drama miniseries in the 1990s
- "Supply and Demand" (CSI: NY), an episode of CSI: NY
- Supply and Demand, a tag team of professional wrestler Val Venis

== See also ==
- Supply (disambiguation)
- Demand (disambiguation)
