= Education in Brazil =

Ministry of Education
- Minister of Education: Camilo Santana

National education budget (2022)
- Budget: 5.95% of GDP; 15.72% of total government expenditure

General details
- Primary languages: Portuguese
- System type: Federal, state, municipal, private

Literacy (2023)
- Total: 95.4%
- Male: 94.7%
- Female: 96.1%

Education in Brazil underwent multiple phases: it first began with Jesuit missions, that controlled education for a long time; then, two hundred years after their arrival, the Jesuits' powers were limited by the Marquis of Pombal; shortly after that, the Brazilian government took over education, which is now run by the government through the Ministry of Education.

Issues in education are now seen through PISA, the Programme for International Student Assessment, and the Idep assessment now used by the Ministry. They have historically tested below average on all topics but are improving in mathematics.

Brazil uses both public and private school systems. They have the traditional primary, secondary, tertiary and technical school levels.

The Human Rights Measurement Initiative finds that Brazil is doing 86.8% of what should be possible at its level of income for the right to education.

== History ==
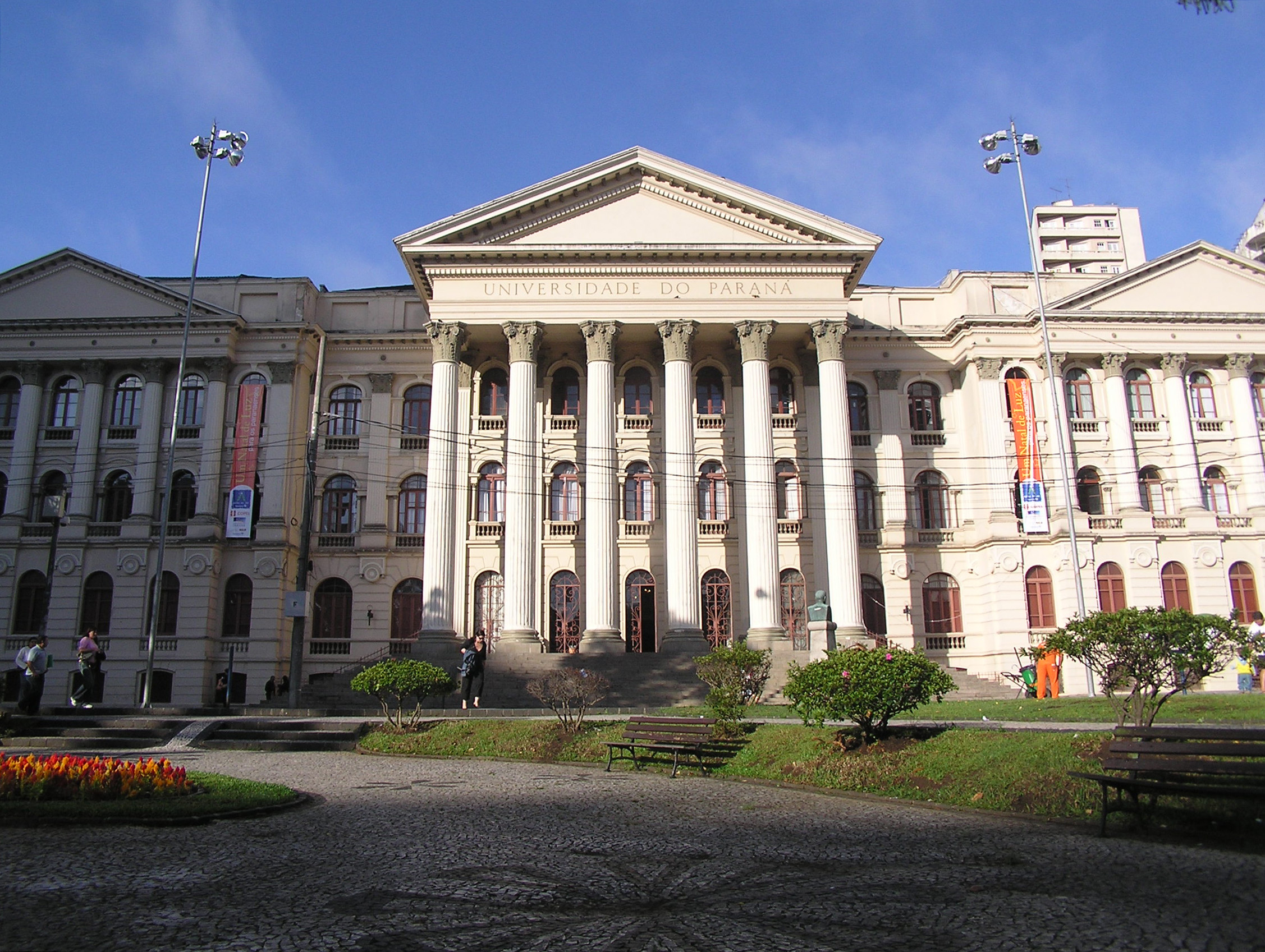
Federal University of Paraná in Curitiba.

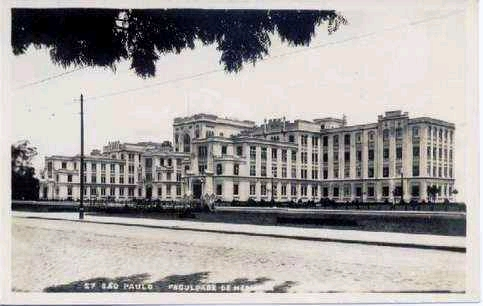
Medicine College of São Paulo.

When Portuguese explorers arrived in Brazil in the 16th century and started to colonize their new possessions in the New World, the territory was inhabited by indigenous peoples and tribes who had no writing system or school education.

The Society of Jesus (Jesuits) was, since its beginnings in 1540, a missionary order. Evangelisation was one of the main goals of the Jesuits and they were committed to teaching and education, in Europe and overseas. The missionary activities, in the cities and in the countryside, were complemented by a strong commitment to education. This took the form of the opening of schools for boys, first in Europe but rapidly extended to America and Asia. The first elementary school in Brazil was founded by the Jesuits in what is now the city of Salvador, Bahia, and they established several others as well as high schools throughout the 1500s. These schools were primarily located in the more coastal regions of Brazil, as those had the largest colonial populations. The foundation of Catholic missions, schools, and seminaries was another consequence of the Jesuit involvement in education. As the spaces and cultures where the Jesuits were present varied considerably, their evangelising methods were very often quite different from one place to another. However, the society's engagement in trade, architecture, science, literature, languages, arts, music and religious debate corresponded to the same main purpose of Christianisation. By the middle of the 16th century, the Jesuits were present in West Africa, South America, Ethiopia, India, China, and Japan. This enlargement of their missionary activities took shape to a large extent within the framework of the Portuguese Empire.

In a period when the world had a largely illiterate population, the Portuguese Empire was home to one of the first universities founded in Europe — the University of Coimbra, which is one of the oldest universities in continuous operation. Throughout the centuries of Portuguese rule, Brazilian students, mostly graduated of the Jesuit missions and seminaries, were allowed to enroll at higher education in mainland Portugal.

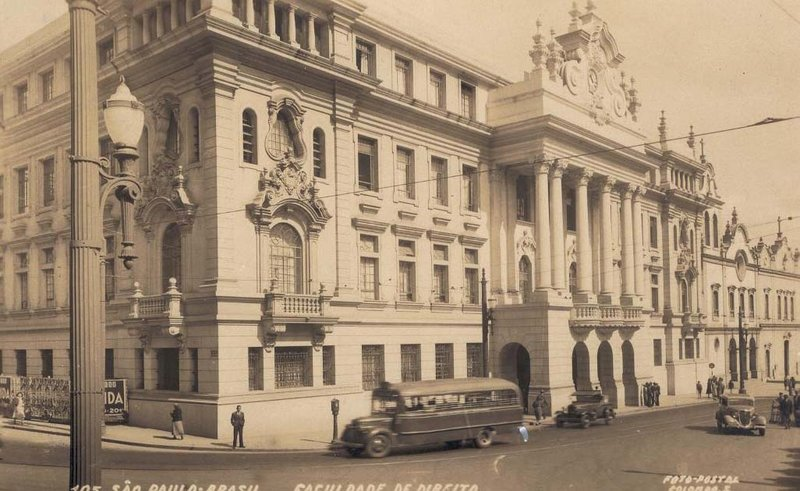
Law School

The Jesuits, a religious order founded to promote the cause and teachings of Catholicism, had gained influence with the Portuguese crown and over education, and had begun missionary work in Portugal's overseas possessions, including the colony of Brazil. By 1700, and reflecting a larger transformation of the Portuguese Empire, the Jesuits had decisively shifted from the East Indies to Brazil. In the late 18th century, Portuguese minister of the kingdom, the Marquis of Pombal, attacked the power of the privileged nobility and the church, and expelled the Jesuits from Portugal and its overseas possessions. Pombal seized the Jesuit schools and introduced education reforms all over the empire. In Brazil, the reforms were noted. Following the expulsion of Jesuits from Brazil, education was primarily left to remaining religious organizations and military institutions, which developed to protect Portuguese interests in the area following the discovery of gold.

In 1772, before the establishment of the Science Academy of Lisbon (1779), one of the first learned societies of Brazil and the Portuguese Empire was founded in Rio de Janeiro: the Sociedade Scientifica. In 1797, the first botanic institute was founded in Salvador, Bahia. During the late 18th century, the Escola Politécnica (Polytechnic School) was created, then the Real Academia de Artilharia, Fortificação e Desenho (Royal Academy for Artillery, Fortifications and Design) was created in Rio de Janeiro, 1792, through a decree issued by the Portuguese authorities as a higher education school for the teaching of the sciences and engineering. Its legacy is shared by the Instituto Militar de Engenharia (Military Engineering Institute) and the Escola Politécnica da Universidade Federal do Rio de Janeiro (Polytechnic School of the Federal University of Rio de Janeiro) — the oldest engineering school of Brazil and one of the oldest in the world.

A royal letter of 20 November 1800 by the king John VI of Portugal established the Aula Prática de Desenho e Figura (Practical Class for Design and Form) in Rio de Janeiro. It was the first institution in Brazil systematically dedicated to the teaching of arts. During colonial times, the arts were mainly religious or utilitarian and were learnt in a system of apprenticeship. A decree on 12 August 1816 created the Escola Real de Ciências, Artes e Ofícios (Royal School of Sciences, Arts and Crafts), which established an official education in the fine arts and built the foundations of the current Escola Nacional de Belas Artes (National School of Fine Arts).

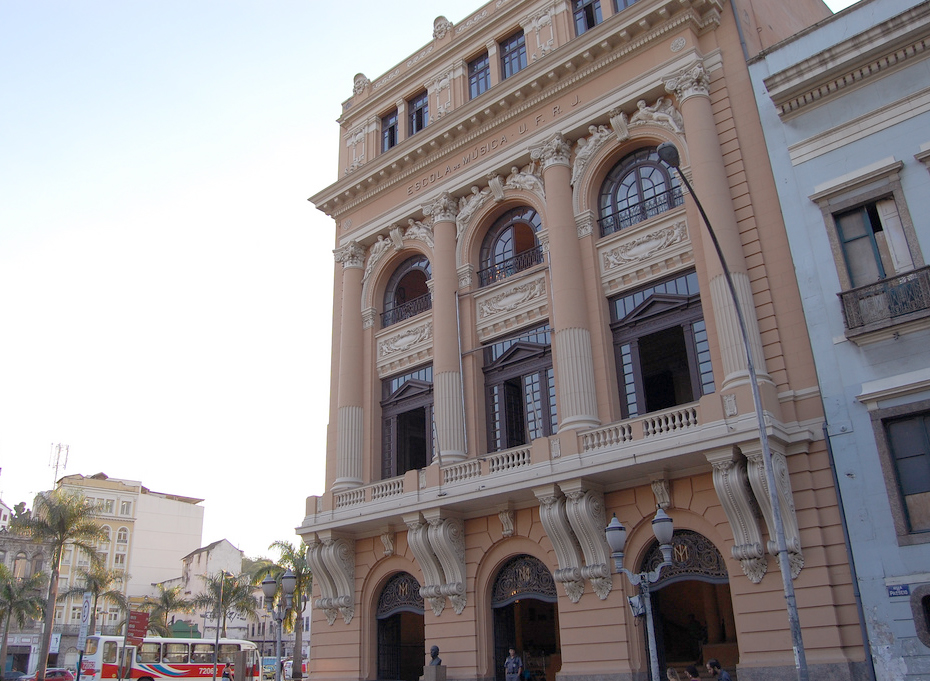
Music school of Federal University of Rio de Janeiro.

In the 19th century, the Portuguese royal family, headed by then prince regent John, arrived in Rio de Janeiro, escaping from the Napoleonic invasion of Portugal in 1807. John VI gave impetus to the expansion of European civilization to Brazil. The presence of the monarchy in Brazil encouraged the development of more formal educational institutions. In the short period between 1808 and 1810, the Portuguese government founded the Academia Real dos Guardas-Marinhas (Royal Naval Academy), the Real Academia Militar (Royal Military Academy), the Biblioteca Nacional (National Library of Brazil), the Jardim Botânico do Rio de Janeiro (Rio de Janeiro Botanical Garden), the Academia Médico-Cirúrgica da Bahia (Medic-Cirurgical Academy of Bahia), now known as Faculdade de Medicina (Med School) in the Universidade Federal da Bahia (Federal University of Bahia) and the Academia Médico-Cirúrgica do Rio de Janeiro (Medic-Cirurgical Academy of Rio de Janeiro) which is now the medical school of the Federal University of Rio de Janeiro.

Brazil achieved independence in 1822. During the period of the Brazilian empire, the government did guarantee primary education to all Brazilians. However, this largely excluded enslaved people and indigenous people. Additionally, the established educational system was largely unable to serve the entire country, given the lack of resources and large size of Brazil. The first public secondary school was established in Rio de Janeiro in 1837, the Imperial Colégio de Pedro II, and served as both a day school as well as a boarding school. Other public secondary schools followed under a similar structure. Despite being public schools, the student bodies were predominately made up of economically well-off white men. Until the 20th century, it was a large rural nation with low social and economic standards comparing to the average North American and European standards. Its economy was based on the primary sector, possessing an unskilled and increasingly larger workforce, composed of free people (including slave owners) and slaves or their direct descendants. Among the first law schools founded in Brazil were the ones in Recife and São Paulo in 1827. But for decades to come, most Brazilian lawyers studied at European universities, such as in the ancient University of Coimbra, in Portugal, which had awarded degrees to generations of Brazilian students since the 16th century.

In 1872 there were 9,930,478 inhabitants (84.8% free and 15.2% slaves). According to the national census made in that year, among the free inhabitants (8,419,672 people), 38% were white, 39% were mixed race and 11% were black. Only 23.4% of the free men and 13.4% of the free women could read and write. In 1889, six decades after independence, only 20% of the total population could read and write. In the former colonial power, Portugal, about 80% of the population was classified as illiterate.

Following the creation of the First Republic, the Ministry of Education, Post, and Telegraph was established. Previous thought on education tended to emphasize humanities-centric curriculums, however the educational legislation from this era focused on creating curriculums that centered on science and mathematics. Additionally, preparatory exams for secondary and tertiary education began to be widely used during the First Republic era. These exams were used to gauge a students preparedness for a certain course or subject. Education during this period continued to be mostly inaccessible to the black population of Brazil, due to the variety of socio-economic pressures they faced despite the abolition of slavery.

With the massive post-war expansion that lasts to date, the government focused on strengthening Brazil's tertiary education, while simultaneously neglecting assistance to primary and secondary education. The problems of primary and secondary education were compounded by significant quality differences across regions, with the northeast suffering dramatically. In the aftermath of Brazilian military rule, education became seen as a way to create a fairer society. "Citizen schools" emerged, designed to promote critical thinking, incorporation of marginalized people, and curiosity (over rote memorization and obedience). Education also became more standardized during and immediately following the World War II era, regulating the length of each level of schooling and the content of lessons, as well as outlining the requirements for becoming a primary school teacher. However, only about 16% of secondary school educators actually held degrees. Additionally, vocational secondary was emphasized as an option for lower-income students. During the period of economic growth around the 1950s, education in Brazil also became more accessible to lower-income people, with the numbers of students in both primary and secondary education significantly increasing.

Today, Brazil struggles to improve the public education offered at earlier stages and maintain the high standards that the population has come to expect from public universities. The choice on public funding is an issue. In particular, the U.N. Development Goal of Universal Primary Education and a larger offer of education for students with special needs are pursued by Brazilian policy-makers.

Despite its shortcomings, Brazil has progressed substantially since the 1980s. The nation witnessed an increase in school enrollment for children age 7–14, from 80.9% in 1980 to 96.4% in the year 2000. In the 15–17 age demographic, in the same period, this rate rose from 49.7% to 83%. Literacy rates rose from 75% to 90.0%.

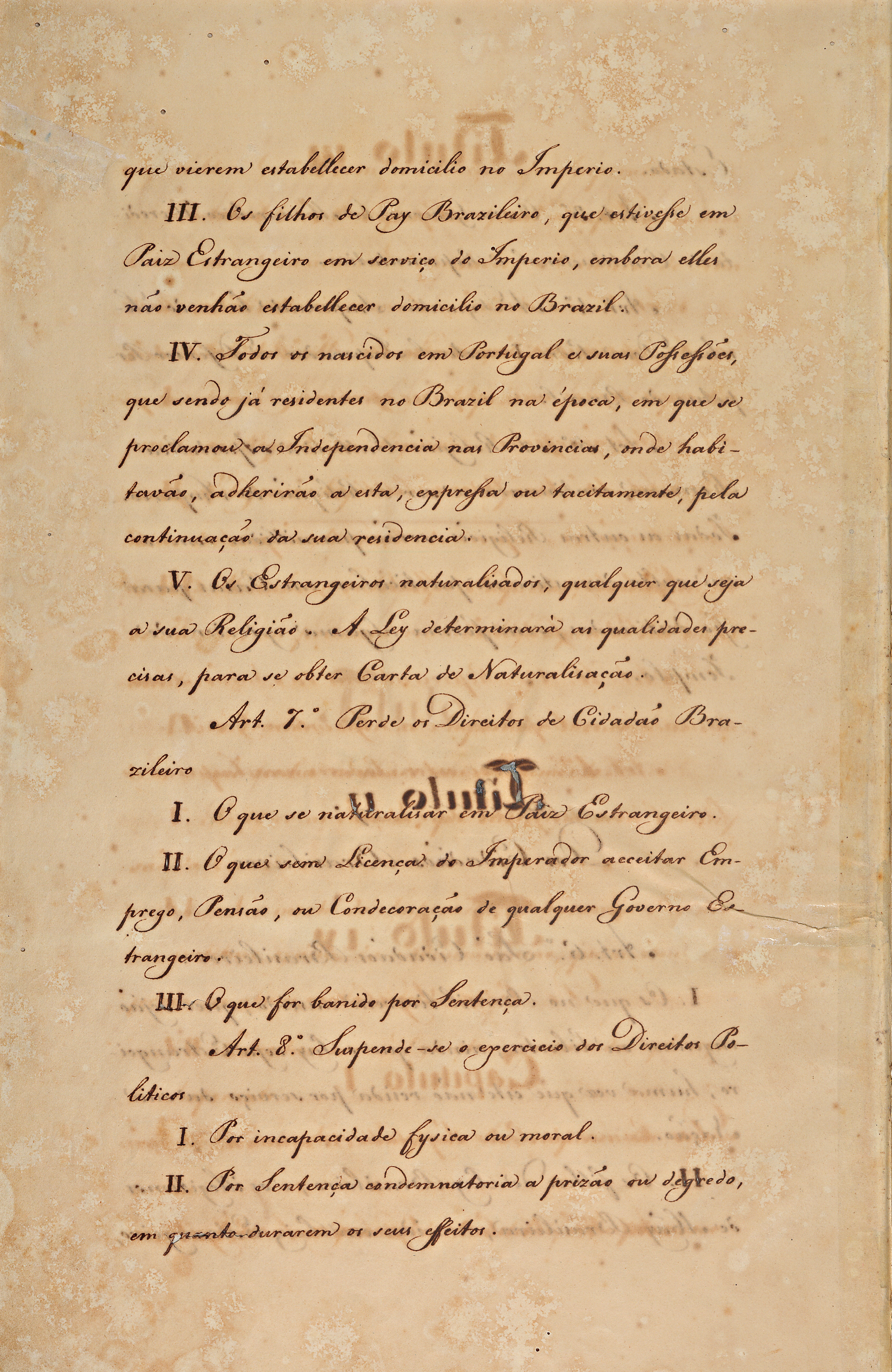
Constitution of 1824

Voting has been mandatory for all citizens of Brazil since the first Constitution of 1824. However, people who are illiterate have, historically, not been able to be registered to vote. The Constitution of 1988 changed this, stating that those who are illiterate have the option to vote but it is not compulsory for those. The Constitution of 1824 also stated that those who made less than 100,000 reis were not able to vote.

Throughout the 20th century, in response to campaigns occurring in other Latinoamérican countries, Brazilian states began their own literacy campaigns. Led by educators like Paulo Freire, the campaigns hoped to combat the high amounts of illiteracy in the countryside. Beginning in 1963, the campaigns were centered in rural areas. Paulo Freire's methods were widely popular due to the immediacy in which they seemed to work: as he claimed, a student could learn to read and write in 40 hours. The growing fear of communism and the rising power of the military led to the end of the campaigns in 1964 and the exile of Freire and others like him. The military government began new campaigns in the late 1970s to questionable improvements.

"Indigenous schools" became an official educational category in 1991 by the Brazilian Ministry of Education and Culture, meaning schools for indigenous people are no longer categorized solely as missionary schools or reservations schools. The change in designation has allowed these schools to be designated as state or municipal public schools, and receive funding and guidelines accordingly. The designation has also allowed more data to be collected on indigenous schools.

== Issues ==
According to PISA, the Programme for International Student Assessment, Brazil, on average, underperforms. Brazilian students score lower than the average in reading, mathematics, and science, the three categories of testing. Their scores have improved since 2000, the first year the test was taken. Since 2000, Brazil has started the Brazil Literate Program to lower the rate of illiteracy in those ages 15 and older. Brazil has also implemented the IDEP, the Index of Basic Education Development, which evaluates school flow and performance rates in the test. According to the website, the index is used to tell whether the educational system should be improved. The program is important in deciding public policy of the educational system. IDEP also led to the creation of the Social Mobilisation program which works to involve the entire community in the educational system. Several other committees have created programs in individual municipalities in order to curb the IDEP findings.

It takes an extra three years to finish elementary school for low-income students, PNAD, the national household survey, shows. Costs of finishing school rise each year until it is impossible to attend, meaning that low-income students also have the lowest rates for completing school. Rio de Janeiro began a program in 2009 called the Reforço Escolar testing all students in the beginning of the school year to discover all who are not yet at grade level. Those who are not receive two weeks of in-depth tutoring. São Paulo and Paraná have also created programs to help those who are behind, either due to being low-income or for other reasons. During the Covid-19 pandemic, many low-income students enrolled in public schools had minimal access to the technology required for virtual learning, as many students did not own personal computers, and schools often did not have the budget to distribute them. From the start of the school closures in March 2020 to August 2020, it is estimated that about 38 million students in basic education were left with no educational instruction or activity. Additionally, many rural and indigenous regions have particularly low access to technology and reliable internet, making virtual learning widely inaccessible to students from those areas.

Additionally, racial inequalities in education are prevalent in Brazil, both in terms dropout rates and quality of education. School materials, such as textbooks often lack the perspectives of Black students or contain stereotypes. Black and mixed-race students are also more likely to attend less school than white students. While the differences between them have narrowed in the 21st century, black students on average get about one year of education less than their white counterparts. In recent years, Brazilian universities have been using affirmative action programs to attempt to remedy these inequalities.

As of 2018, the illiteracy rate for people age 15 or more was of 6.8%.

== Organization and structure ==
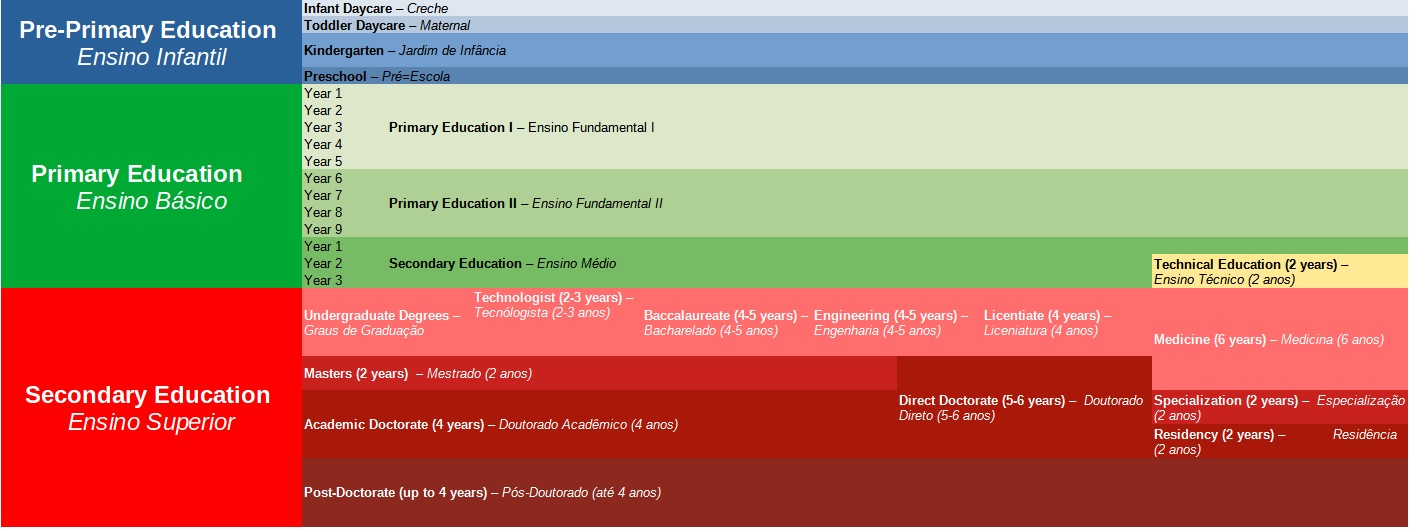
Table denoting the organization of the Brazilian education system.

Education is divided into three levels, with grades in each level:

- Pre-school education (educação infantil) is found in public institutions and private institutions.
- Basic education (ensino básico) is found in public institutions and private institutions, and mandatory for those between the ages of 6 and 17. It consists of elementary school (ensino fundamental) and high school (ensino médio).
- Higher education (ensino superior) (including graduate degrees) is found in public institutions and private institutions.

=== Pre-school education (educação infantil) ===
Pre-school education is optional and exists to aid in the development of children under 6. It aims to assist in all areas of child development, including motor skills, cognitive skills, and social skills while providing fertile ground for the later acquisition of knowledge and learning. There are day nurseries for children under 2, kindergartens for 2- to 3-year-olds, and preschools for children 4 and up. Public preschools are provided by city governments. Pre-school education is typically taught by a combination of teachers who hold early childhood education degrees and teachers' aides, who typically only need a high school education. The average child-staff ratio in pre-school education is 1 teacher to every 14 students, and 8 students to every staff member including both teachers and aides.

=== Elementary school (ensino fundamental) ===
Elementary school is mandatory for children ages 6–14. There are nine "academic years", "grades" or anos as they are called (as opposed to the former eight grades of elementary school). The current "first year" broadly corresponds to the former pre-school last year of private institutions, and its aim is to achieve literacy. Generally speaking, the only prerequisite for enrolling in first year is that a child should be 6 years old, but some education systems allow children younger than 6 to enroll in first year (as long as they turn 6 during the first academic semester). Older students who have not completed their elementary education are allowed to attend, though those over 18 are separated from the younger children.

The National Council of Education (Conselho Nacional de Educação) establishes a core curriculum consisting of Portuguese language, history, geography, science, mathematics, arts and physical education (for years 1, 2, 3, 4 and 5). As for years 6, 7, 8 and 9, one foreign language is also compulsory (usually English).

Each education system supplements this core curriculum with a diversified curriculum defined by the needs of the region and the abilities of individual students.

Elementary education is divided in two stages, called Ensino Fundamental I (years 1–5) and Ensino Fundamental II (years 6–9). During Ensino Fundamental I each group of students is usually assisted by a single teacher. In Ensino Fundamental II, there are as many teachers as subjects.

The length of the school year is set by the National Education Bases and Guidelines Law (Lei de Diretrizes e Bases da Educação) to at least 200 days. Elementary schools must provide students with at least 800 hours of activities per year. The school calendar is set by individual schools, which often organize their calendars according to planting and harvesting seasons in rural areas.

=== High school (ensino médio) ===
Students must have completed their elementary school before they enroll in high school. High school takes three years. The minimum is 2,200 hours of teaching over three years. High school core curriculum comprises Portuguese (including Portuguese language, essay studies, Brazilian and Portuguese literatures), foreign language (usually English and an optional language), History, Geography, Mathematics, Physics, Chemistry, Arts, Physical Education, and Biology. Philosophy and Sociology, which were banned during the military dictatorship (1964–1985), have become compulsory again.

=== Technical education (ensino técnico) ===
The ingress, coursing or the completion of high school is mandatory for those who intend to enroll in technical education. In addition, students must pass an entrance examination for their specific course. These institutions usually have a greater number of hours per week. The instruction of the technical course lasts from one year and a half to two years.

=== Higher education (ensino superior) ===
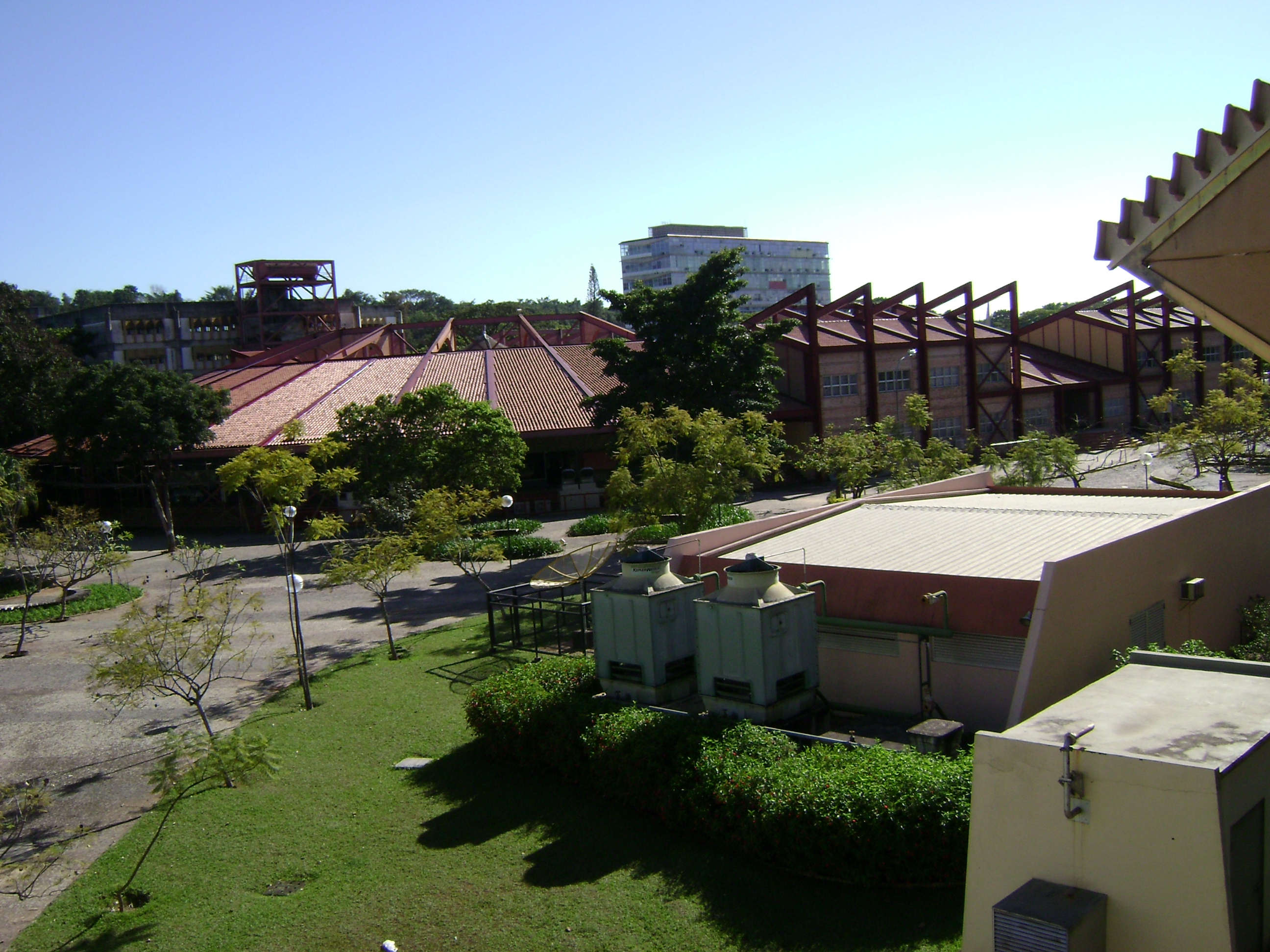
Federal University of Minas Gerais

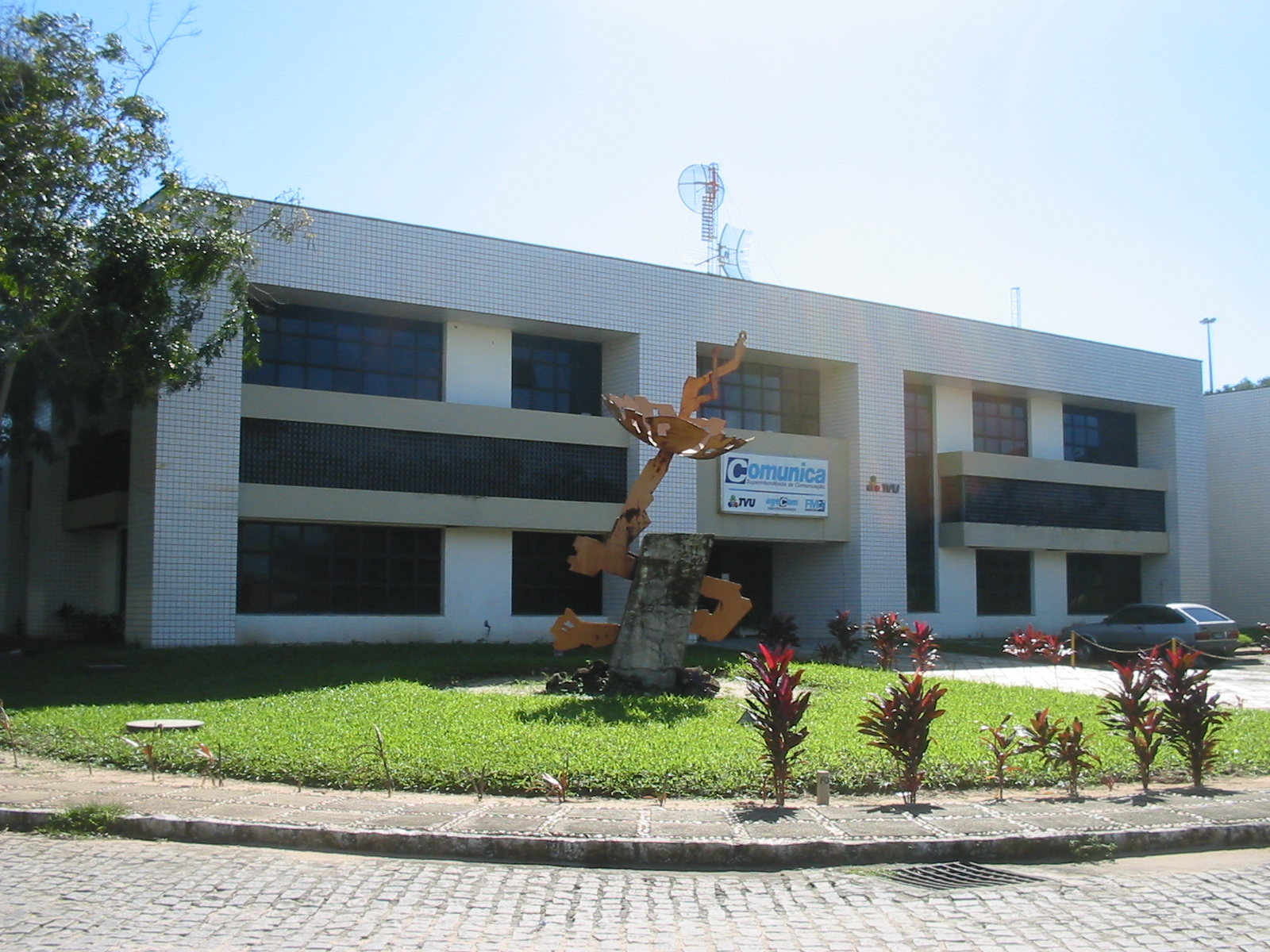
TV station in Federal University of Rio Grande do Norte

The completion of high school or equivalent is mandatory for those who intend to enroll in higher education. In addition, students must pass an entrance examination (known as vestibular) for their specific course. The number of candidates per available place in the freshman class may be in excess of 30 or 40 to one in the not so competitive courses at the top public universities. The most competitive ones excess 80 or 150. In some courses with small number of vacancies, this number can be as high as 200 (medical school, for example).

As is the case in many nations, higher education in Brazil can be divided into undergraduate and graduate work. In addition to providing education, universities promote research and provide separate classes to the community. The Brazilian standard for technology (Associate degree), licentiate or bachelor's degree is awarded in most areas of the arts, humanities, social sciences, exact sciences, or natural sciences, and lasts two to three years for technology courses, three to four years for licenciate and bachelor's courses in general and five to six years for special bachelor's courses such as law, architecture, engineering, human medicine and veterinary medicine.

After graduation students can take postgraduate courses being these lato sensu or stricto sensu. Lato sensu graduate degrees are specializations and refinements lasting one to two years and do not confer academic title. At the end of the course the student must present a course completion work. (Example of lato sensu: MBA, specialization, medical residency, among others). Graduate degrees stricto sensu are courses that confer academic title. After graduation, the student must do a master's degree with a duration of two years and after that period present a master's thesis. If it is approved by the examining board, it will receive the master's degree. The doctorate course in Brazil is the most academic degree course. In order to study this postgraduate course it is necessary to have the title of Master. The doctorate has a duration of four years and must be unpublished. After four years of course the student will present the doctoral thesis to an assessment bank, if approved will receive the title of Doctor.

There are more than 2,600 universities in Brazil, between private and public, according to MEC. Higher vocational education is in general assumed by non-university institutions and the federal Institutions for Education, Science and Technology (38 in 2008).

Studies show that, despite the expansion of access to Higher Education in Brazil, this had very limited impact on the country's social disparities.

== Teacher training and qualification ==
Students can obtain teacher training in secondary schools through vocational programs. In addition to the required courses to graduate, students take teacher training courses which includes a supervised internship and need 300 hours of teaching practice. Students can be certified through the secondary school program; however, to teach secondary schools, most teaching students need higher education to obtain either a master's or doctorate's. Schools do offer school administration training, but it is not compulsory for students hoping to become an administrator. The licenses and degrees are as follows: teaching certification through vocational programs, a bachelor's, master's, and doctorate. Recently, the government has released a new National Education Plan outlining 20 goals to improve national education, four of which outline improvements to teacher training.

== Educational statistics ==
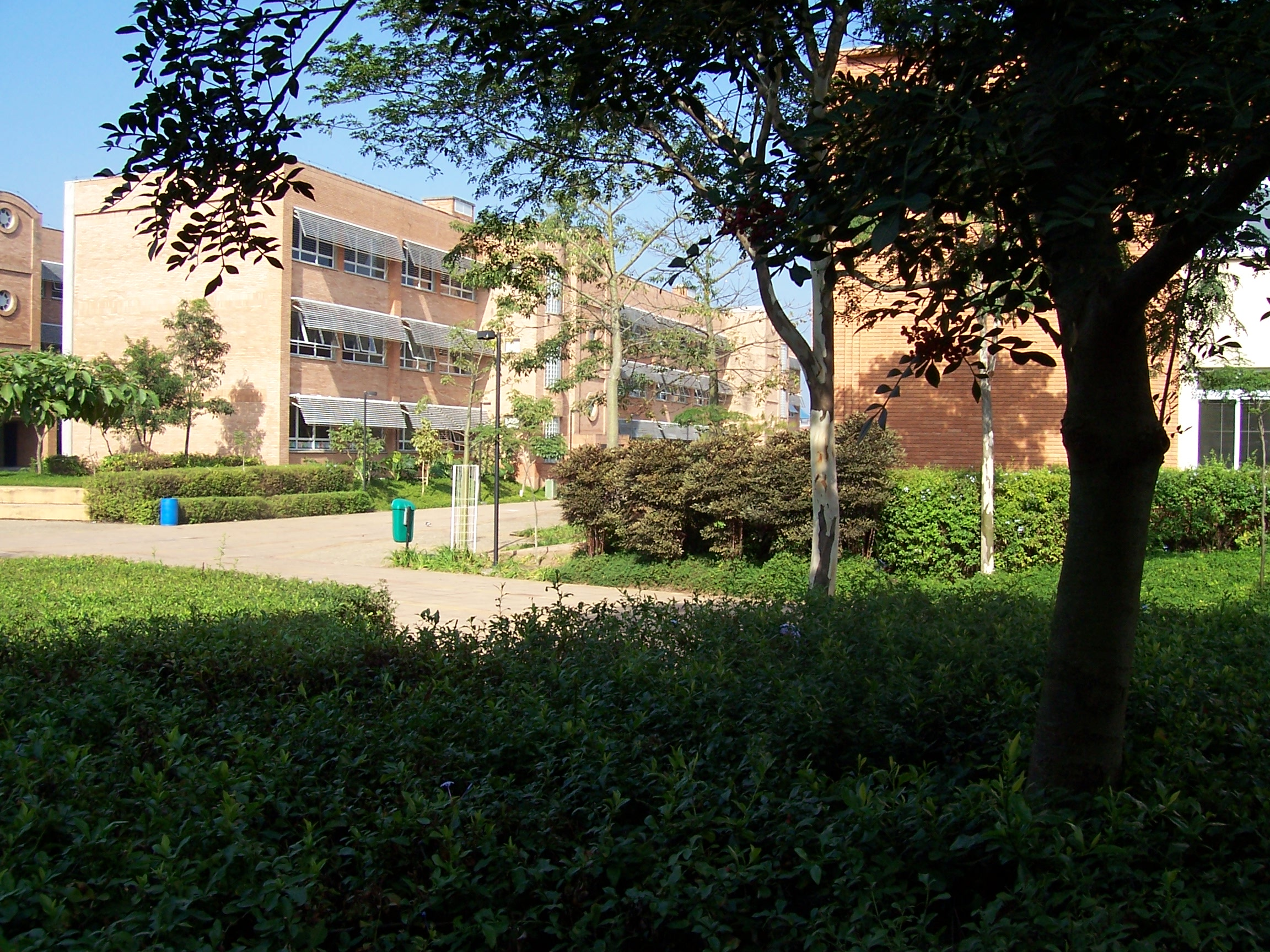
Private German school in São Paulo.

As a large middle-income country, Brazil has several regions. Its education system is accordingly plagued by many deficiencies and social and regional disparities.

As of 2017:

- Literacy rate of 91.73% for people age 15 or older

As of 2017:

- The nation invests 5.95% of GDP on education, approximately 15.72% of total government expenditures.

As of 2017:

- Literacy rate of 67.8% for people age 6 to 14
- Literacy rate of 79.1% for people age 15 to 17

PISA results as of 2018:

- Performance
  - Science: Below average; stable since 2006
  - Mathematics: Below average; improvement since 2006
  - Reading: Below average; stable since 2006
- Equity
  - Boys versus Girls: Average; stable since 2006
  - Social Background: Average; stable since 2006
  - Immigrant students: Below average

== International education ==
As of January 2015, the International Schools Consultancy (ISC) listed Brazil as having 136 international schools. ISC defines an 'international school' in the following terms: "ISC includes an international school if the school delivers a curriculum to any combination of pre-school, primary or secondary students, wholly or partly in English outside an English-speaking country, or if a school in a country where English is one of the official languages, offers an English-medium curriculum other than the country's national curriculum and is international in its orientation." This definition is used by publications including The Economist.

== See also ==
- Associação Brasileira de Educação a Distância
- Education policy in Brazil
- Privatization
- São Paulo Media Center
- New Brazilian secondary education
