= History of Brazil's economic policy =

Brazil GDP per capita, 1800 to 2018

Brazil's economic policy can be broadly defined by the Brazilian government's choice of fiscal policies, and the Brazilian Central Bank’s choice of monetary policies. Throughout the history of the country, economic policy has changed depending on administration in power, producing different results.

== Brazil's Economic Policy Throughout History ==
=== Republic of the United States of Brazil (1946–1964) ===
The period following the Second World War and prior to the Military Dictatorship is characterized by many tumultuous presidencies.

==== Presidency of João Goulart (1961–1964) ====
The presidency of João Goulart in particular was the catalyst for the military dictatorship coming into power. From the time he took office in 1961, he faced rising inflation, a slowdown in GDP growth, a deficit in the balance of payments for foreign accounts, difficulties attracting foreign capital, and lack of domestic savings. Goulart attempted to fix these issues and increase his level of public support with a moderate approach to economic policy. More specifically, he adopted economic populism, which can be defined as "...an approach to economics that emphasizes growth and income distribution and deemphasizes the risks of inflation and deficit finance, external constraints and the reaction of economic agents to aggressive non-market policies."

The Goulart Administration created a three-year plan for the economy, though it had little effect due to the government's resistance in taking any action that might decelerate economic growth. The economic troubles were further exacerbated by threats made by the United States to follow demands for adjustments in the economy, and remove anti-American and leftist politicians from the Goulart administration or face economic pressure.

After becoming increasingly frustrated, Goulart's political and economic decisions became increasingly leftist, putting him in opposition to conservatives, the military, and especially the American government. His nationalist reforms, from limits on foreign companies' profit remittances to modest land reforms became a particular point of contention. His plan for Basic Reforms (Reformas Basicas) involved many sectors of the economy, and was largely focused on aiding those of a low socioeconomic status and became a particular point of contention with the military and conservatives. As a result, there were increased demands for Goulart to be removed from power. Ultimately resulting in the 1964 coup d'état by the Brazilian military.

=== Military dictatorship (1964–1985) ===
The Brazilian Military Dictatorship is now remembered for widespread human rights violations, including the torture, forced disappearance, and murder of many political opponents. However, at the time, the dictatorship also received support nationally and internationally for a period of exceptional growth for the Brazilian economy. After President Goulart was forcibly removed from power, the military regime adopted a heterodox, developmentalist policy, which is credited for creating the economic miracle under the leadership of Delfim Netto. The country also grew increasingly reliant on foreign capital, mostly in the form of foreign credit, resulting in a significant boost in industrial production, enough to cover interest and principal payments.

The strategy ensured a period of exceptionally high economic growth from 1968 to 1973. Growth rates reached an annual average of more than 11 percent per year (for reference, China grew at a high of 8 percent in 2021). By the early 1980s, Brazil had the tenth-largest gross national product in the world.

However, Netto's economic plan also created many setbacks. First, the reliance on foreign capital meant that between 1964 and 1973, Brazil's external debt would quadruple, going from US$3.1 billion to US$12.5 billion. By the end of the regime in 1985, external debt reached US$96 billion. Second, the inequality in the wealth distribution grew from the 1% holding between 15% and 20% of the country's income in 1964 to controlling almost 30% by 1985. Third, the underlying problem of inflation remained and grew worse, going from 40% per year in 1978 to 240% in 1985. Fourth, the policies adopted to maintain economic growth were found to be unsustainable, as shown by the explosive growth of foreign debt during the dictatorship, and GDP growth would fall.

=== The New Republic (1985 – Present) ===
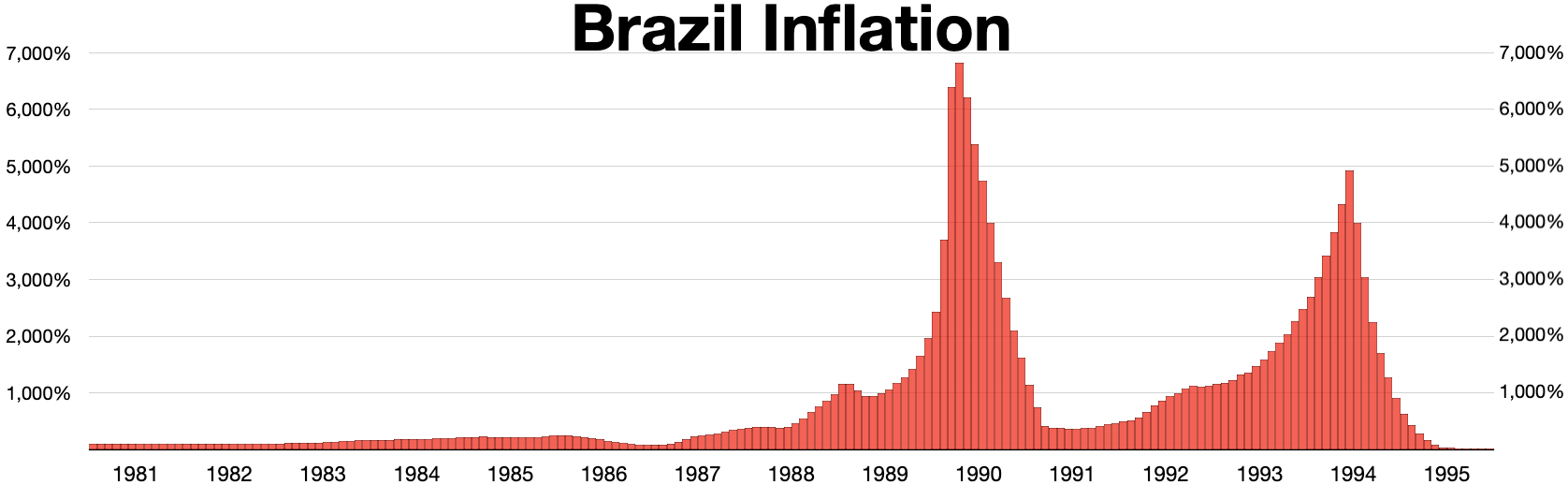
Brazil Inflation 1981–1995

==== The Real Plan (1994) ====
The Plano Real (Real Plan) were a set of measures taken to stabilize the Brazilian economy, particularly against hyperinflation. The plan stopped index inflation, introduced the Real (Brazil's currency), created an exchange rate that was partially pegged to the U.S. dollar for stability, and limited government spending. As seen in the image "Brazil Inflation 198-1995", the plan was successful in quickly reducing inflation.

==== Fernando Henrique Cardoso's presidency (1995–2003) ====
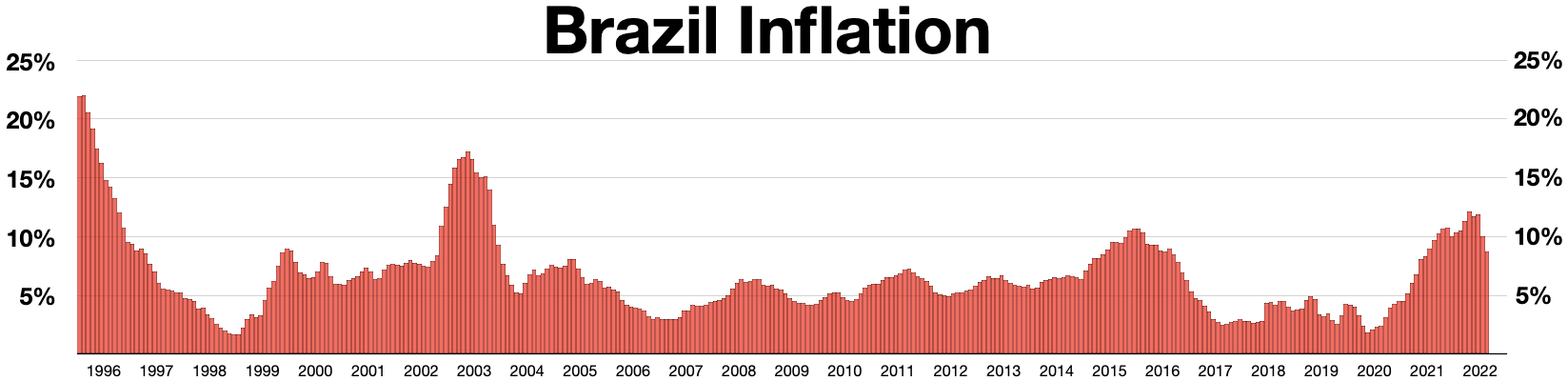
Brazil inflation 1996–2022

President Cardoso had been the finance minister and inventor of the Plano Real. The program's success and his resulting popularity meant he was able to easily win the presidential election of 1995. His economic policies continued to be successful in decreasing inflation while maintaining economic growth. During his term he "[lowered] the annual inflation rate even more dramatically—from nearly 1,000 percent in 1994 to less than 20 percent within a year and nearly zero by 1998."

==== Brazilian economic crisis (2014) ====
In the decade prior to 2014 economic crisis, Brazil had enjoyed quick economic growth, reaching a growth rate of 7.5% in 2010, enabled by the economic policies and social programs that decreased poverty in the country. However, soon after the election of Dilma Rousseff, the economy began to slow in terms of real GDP growth, with many attributing it to policy changes now directed at changing investment and productivity instead of domestic demand.

It was not until 2014, however, that the situation truly began to worsen. As seen in the right side of the "Economic Growth in Brazil" graph, Brazil entered a severe economic crisis that saw a quick decline in the GDP of the country. Similarly to the slow down from the previous years, the decline in GDP is argued to have been caused by inconsistent economic policies implemented by the Rousseff Administration. Examples include artificial reductions of interest rates, weakening fiscal regulations, limits on the return rate for private investments in infrastructure, and more. Rousseff was also criticized for failing to follow many economic principles.

==== 2020s ====
Brazil is the world’s fifth-largest country and Latin America’s largest economy. During the tenure of right-wing President Jair Bolsonaro (from 1 January 2019 to 31 December 2022) there were privatization reforms in Brazil, including plans to privatize the state oil company. In October 2022 election, former President Luiz Inacio “Lula” Da Silva of the leftist Worker’s Party (PT), won incumbent president Bolsonaro, whose privatization reforms are expected to become reversed. However, the center-right opposition still held a large congressional plurality.

== See also ==
- Economy of Brazil
- Inflation indexes in Brazil
