= Digital Material (CMSP) =

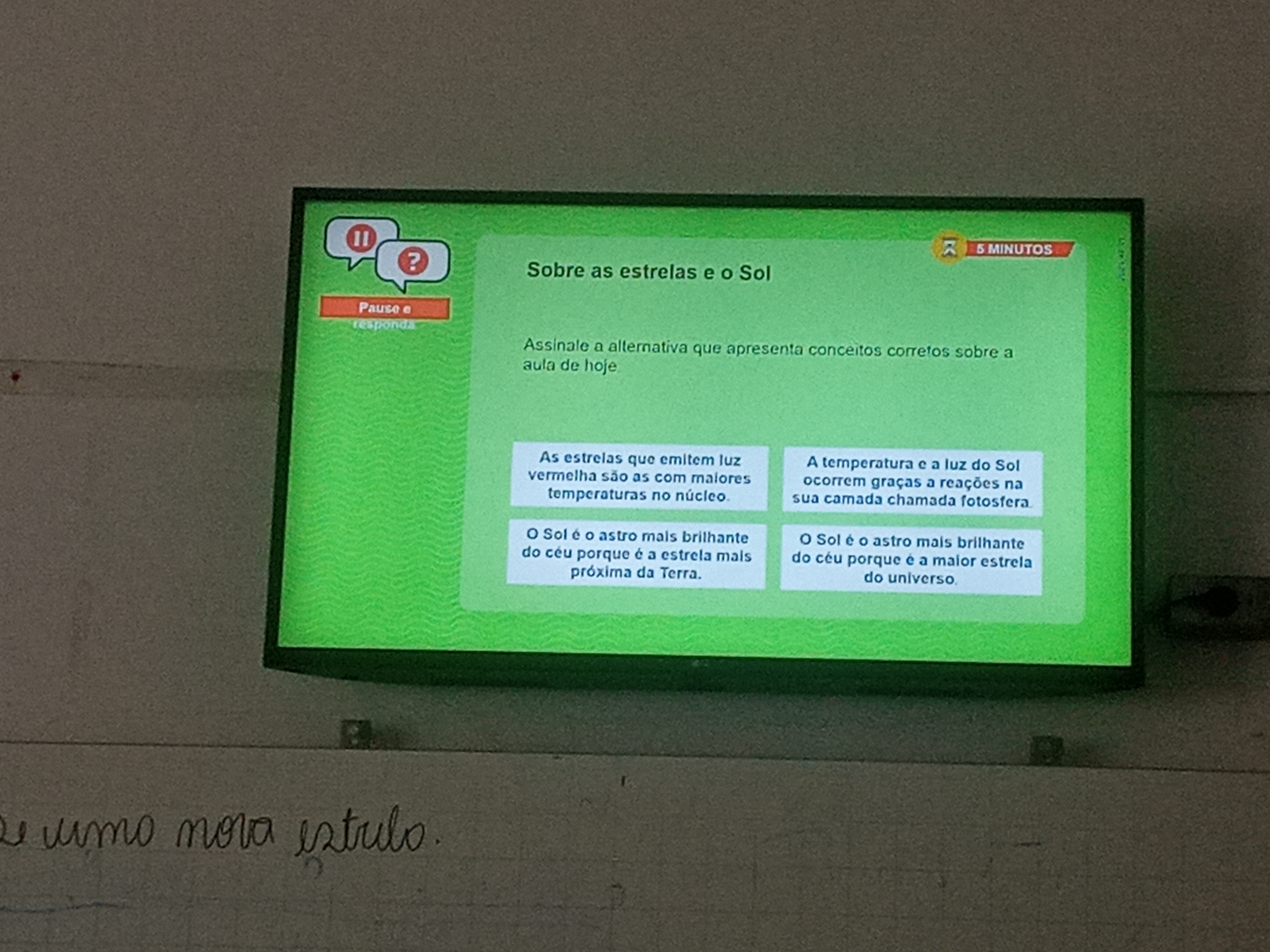
A multiple-choice question slide of the Digital Material, broadcast on TV during a Science class in a public school of Piracicaba

Digital Material is a digital platform of the São Paulo Media Center (CMSP) educational portal, aimed at enhancing the learning experience of students in the state of São Paulo, Brazil. This platform was officially launched by the São Paulo State Department of Education (SEDUC-SP) in April 2023 and began full implementation in July 2023.

Digital Material consists of slide presentations organized by lesson numbers, which are used by professors in classrooms and displayed on television. The initiative was introduced by Renato Feder, the state secretary of education at the time, who emphasized that the Digital Material would connect students with 21st century technologies, thereby modernizing the educational experience.

== Implementation and changes ==
Digital Material was initially launched in April 2023, and fully implemented by July 2023. The move to digital resources was part of a broader initiative to enhance education through technology. Despite these advancements, the decision to replace traditional scholar books with digital resources led to significant controversy.

During the transition to this digital platform, the "Currículo em Ação" scholar books program was temporarily suspended to allow for the exclusive use of the digital resources provided by CMSP. However, in high school, the program continued within the Technology and Innovation sector during the third term.

In August 2023 SEDUC-SP announced the discontinuation of the Brazilian Ministry of Education (MEC) books for 2024, opting instead for the digital materials. However, this decision was reversed on August 16 due to pressure from the judiciary and public outcry. By October 2023, the "Currículo em Ação" books were reintroduced for both elementary and high school students, with specific volumes designated for the fourth term.

== Controversies and failures ==
Digital Material has faced considerable criticism since its launch. Among the notable issues were:

- A slide incorrectly stated that São Paulo had a beach, referencing a decree by then-mayor Jânio Quadros in 1961 that prohibited bikinis on the city's beaches, despite the fact that the city is located at least 70 kilometers from the coast. The slide read: "A proibição do uso de biquínis foi adotada por Jânio Quadros em 1961, quando ele era prefeito de São Paulo. Ele emitiu um decreto vetando o uso de biquínis nas praias da cidade" ("The ban on the use of bikinis was adopted by Jânio Quadros in 1961, when he was mayor of São Paulo. He issued a decree vetoing the use of bikinis on the city's beaches")
- Another slide inaccurately attributed the signing of the Golden Law (Lei Áurea) to Dom Pedro II, when it was actually signed by Princess Isabel.
- A slide intended for 7th-grade students claimed that contaminated water could transmit Parkinson's disease, Alzheimer's disease, and depression. Experts criticized this statement, asserting that it lacked scientific basis and could lead to confusion among students.

Digital Material was found to contain various errors in Portuguese-language usage and mathematical operations. Upon discovery the erroneous materials were swiftly removed and corrected.
