= Fiscal adjustment =

A fiscal adjustment is a reduction in the government primary budget deficit, and it can result from a reduction in government expenditures, an increase in tax revenues, or both simultaneously.

There is no a clear consensus about the definition of fiscal adjustment, but it is commonly understood as a process, instead of as a status: governments run fiscal deficits, fiscal surpluses or balanced budgets, and the process from a budget deficit to a sustained period of balanced budget is a fiscal adjustment.

There are two significant features in any fiscal adjustment: the duration of the process, usually measured in years, that defines the intensity of the effort; and the composition of the adjustment, measured as the proportion of the adjustment obtained from expenditure cuts compared to the proportion gained from tax increases.

== Fiscal adjustments in Europe ==
European countries experienced intense processes of fiscal adjustment during the 1990s, in order to match the Maastricht criteria and to accede to the Economic and Monetary Union (EMU). The treaty established that any country acceding to the Euro area should keep his government primary budget deficit below the line of three percent, and the first assessment was established for 1997.

The empirical research found that European governments adopted multiple strategies during the 1990s to fulfill the fiscal prerequisites for EMU accession. It concluded that the ideology of the party in government became the most powerful predictor of fiscal policies and strategies of adjustment. Evidence shows that in the new context, socialist governments preferred to use balanced budgets to finance supply-side policies of capital formation and to maintain public employment, and are reluctant to cut these expenditures even at the expense of public consumption and transfers. In a most broader analysis of the period, from the 1970s to the present, results confirmed the hypotheses that, besides economic conditions, fragmentation of decision-making, ideology of the party in government, and closeness to elections affect fiscal policy in general and adjustment strategies in particular.

== Fiscal adjustments in the United States ==
See U.S. monetary and fiscal experience

== Fiscal adjustments in Latin America ==
Due to a combination of factors, including previous debt-based development policies, high interest rates, high oil prices and a decline in the terms of trade Latin American countries experienced a dozen of years of continuous economic depression during the 1980s, known as the lost decade, in which hyperinflation episodes were common. One of the most pressing issues was to manage the debt burden.

And, to this end, during this period, the economic policies of Latin American countries evolved from import substitution industrialization to a flawed version of neoliberal economics, sponsored by some international financial institutions like the World Bank or the International Monetary Fund (IMF), and also known as the Washington Consensus, that advocated for fiscal discipline and for a tax reform based on a flattening of the tax curve (lowering the tax rates on proportionally high tax brackets, and raising the tax rates on the proportionally low tax brackets).

The IMF designed structural adjustment policies that advocated for fiscal adjustments based on expenditure cuts, because they usually included, among other conditionalities:

- Cutting social expenditure,
- Removing price controls and state subsidies,
- Privatization, or divestiture of all or part of state-owned enterprises.

== Additional evidence ==
According to some empirical research by economists at this institution, expenditure-based fiscal adjustments were more stable and durable than revenue-based strategies during the 1980s in Latin American and African countries running structural adjustment programs.

== See also ==
- Fiscal discipline
- Debt
- Government budget deficit
- Structural adjustment
