= Demand (disambiguation) =

Demand is the desire to own something and the ability to pay for it.

Demand may also refer to:

== Economics ==
- Demand schedule, a table that lists the quantity of a good a person will buy it each different price
- Demand curve, a graphical representation of a demand schedule
- Demand pull theory, the theory that inflation occurs when demand for goods and services exceeds existing supplies
- Demand-side economics, the school of economics that believes government spending and tax cuts strengthen the economy by raising demand
- Demand deposit, the money in checking accounts

== Other uses ==
- Demand Media, an online media company
- Demand (electrical engineering) the amount of electrical power being withdrawn from an electrical grid
