= São Paulo Media Center =

São Paulo former educational media centre

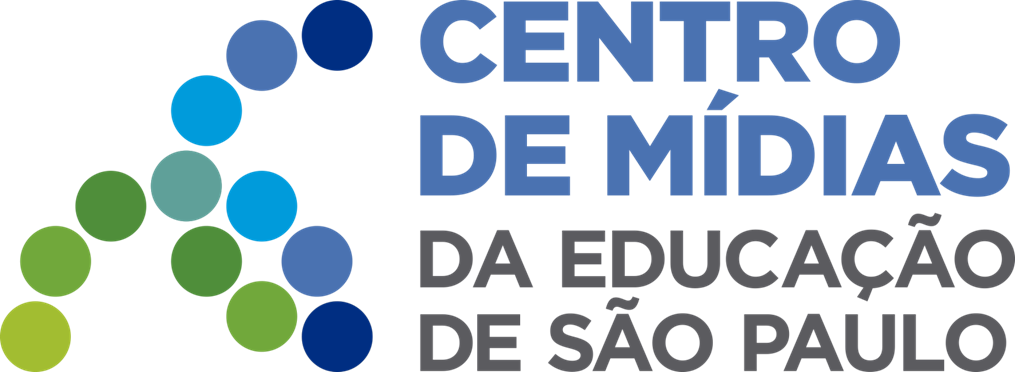
- CMSP logo in 2021

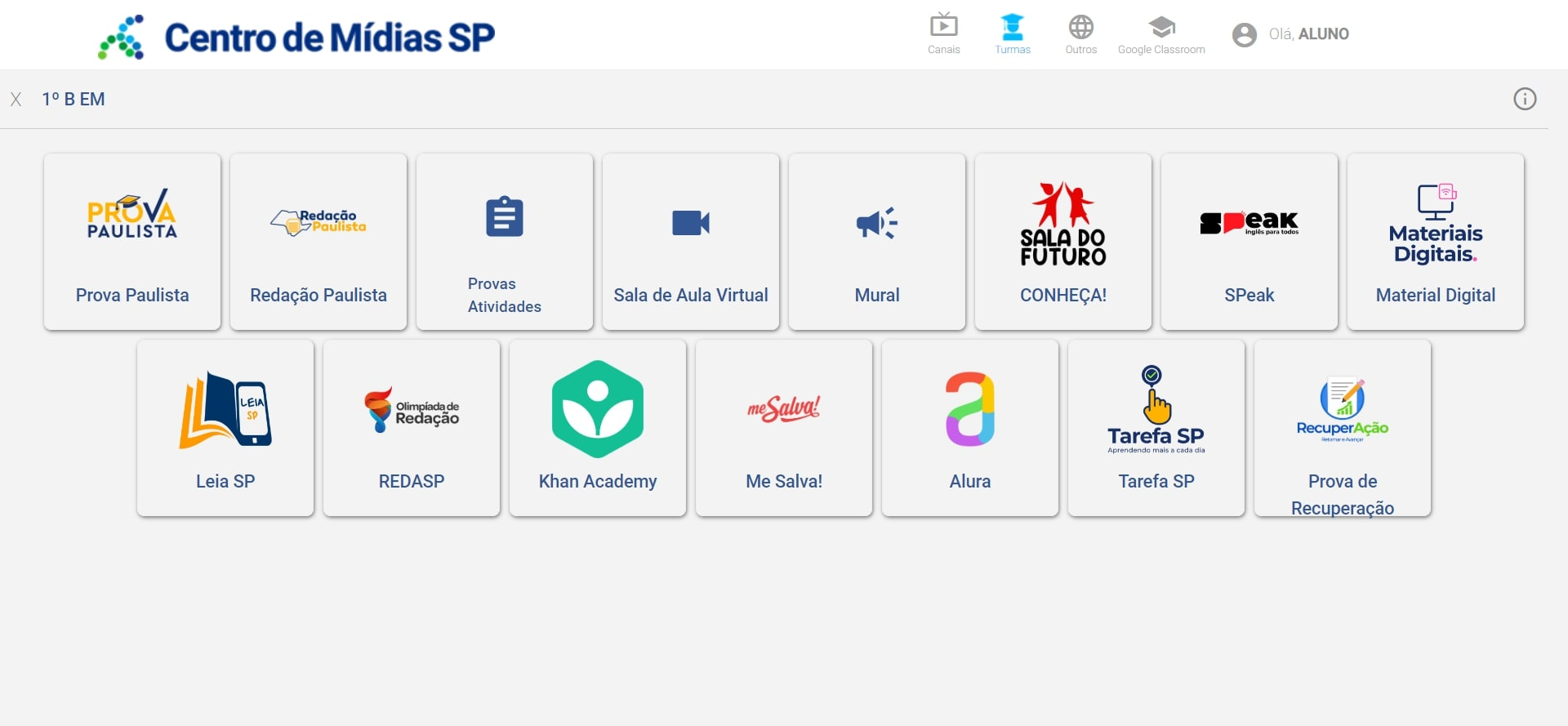
- The 15 platforms currently used by CMSP on High School (ensino médio) in 2024.
- Native name: Centro de Mídias da Educação do Estado de São Paulo
- Website type: Educational web portal
- Available in: 2 languages
- List of languages Portuguese (original) and English (partial)
- Founded: March 2020
- Dissolved: December 15, 2024
- Successor: Future Classroom
- Country of origin: Brazil
- Creator: São Paulo State Department of Education (SEDUC-SP)
- Website: cmspweb.ip.tv
- Registration: Required
- Current status: Closed

The São Paulo Media Center, officially known as the São Paulo Educational Media Center (Portuguese: Centro de Mídias da Educação de São Paulo), or CMSP for short, was an educational web portal operated by the São Paulo State Department of Education (SEDUC-SP) that served the state's public schools.

Originally developed as an educational platform to deliver remote classes during the COVID-19 pandemic, it evolved into the primary educational resource for schools across the state of São Paulo. The website integrated various smaller platforms between 2023 and 2024, including both those owned by SEDUC-SP, such as Leia SP, and others that had been acquired, like EF Education First (called SPeak from June 2024).

CMSP was discontinued in 2025 due to the excess of educational platforms, reaching the apex of 15 platforms at the end of 2024. It was replaced by the educational portal Future Classroom.

== History ==
The São Paulo Media Center was launched in March 2020 in response to the COVID-19 pandemic, which necessitated the adaptation of educational methods to remote learning. Although the application was officially announced in March 2020, its activities began on April 27, 2020. In July, it enabled real-time interaction between students and teachers, facilitating an engaging learning environment where students could ask questions, participate in discussions, and complete supplementary activities.

Initially, the CMSP platform offered classes for students from the 1st to 5th years of Elementary School, which were, in addition to the application, also broadcast on TV UNIVESP. Classes for the 6th year of Elementary School through the 3rd year of High School were aired on TV Educação.

In 2021, CMSP unified its mobile applications, which had previously operated as separate applications for different educational levels: one for the 1st to 5th years of Elementary School and another for the 6th year of Elementary School through the 3rd grade of High School.

In 2022, the São Paulo Media Center adapted its operations in response to the return of in-person classes following the COVID-19 pandemic. Despite this transition, the CMSP continued to broadcast online classrooms and served as a supplementary resource for teachers and students in traditional classroom settings.

From January 9 to February 2, 2023, the CMSP aired a special rerun of classes, revisiting educational content from the 2022 year. This initiative allowed students and educators to review key concepts and engage with previously covered material, ensuring continuity in learning as students returned to face-to-face instruction.

On March 28, 2023, the CMSP launched its first internal platform, Prova Paulista, which provided access to the bimonthly exam of the same name. This initiative aimed to facilitate the evaluation process for students across the state's public school network.

In April 2023, CMSP introduced the Digital Material platform, designed to offer educational resources in various formats, including PDFs and editable presentations. The implementation of these digital materials was scheduled for the beginning of the third term of the 2023 school year, on July 25, with the objective of enhancing the overall teaching and learning experience for both teachers and students.

The rollout of digital materials in July 2023 marked a significant transition towards digital teaching within the public school system of São Paulo. During this period, the "Currículo em Ação" scholar books program was temporarily suspended to accommodate the exclusively digital resources provided by CMSP. However, in the high school sector, the program continued in the Technology and Innovation area throughout the third term.

On July 24, 2023, CMSP launched the Prepara SP platform, specifically designed for 3rd year high school students to prepare for the National High School Exam (ENEM). The following day, on July 25, 2023, the Paulista Essay platform was introduced alongside the Digital Material initiative. In August 2023, additional platforms were launched, including Khan Academy, Tarefa SP, and Alura Start, the latter of which was contracted for BRL 30 million without a bidding process.

At the beginning of August 2023, the SEDUC-SP initially decided not to use the scholar books provided by the Ministry of Education (MEC) for the upcoming 2024 school year. This decision was revisited on August 16, 2023, following pressure from the judiciary. By October 2023, the "Currículo em Ação" books were reinstated for both elementary and high school students, with specific volumes designated for the fourth bimester.

On February 16, 2024, CMSP added three new platforms, including Leia SP from the Spanish company Odilo, the Australian math platform Matific, and Micro Bit for robotics classes. Matific was included only for 6th to 9th-grade elementary school students, while Micro Bit was introduced for 8th and 9th-grade students in 9-hour elementary schools. On May 6, 2024, SEDUC-SP also acquired the EF Education First platform, aimed at offering an online English course to students. In June 2024, EF Education First changed its name to SPeak.

Throughout 2024, additional platforms were added to CMSP, including Elefante Letrado on July 2, Remedial Exam on August 4, and the São Paulo Essay Olympiad (REDASP) on August 19, which was the last permanent platform on CMSP before the education portal was replaced by Future Classroom.

Due to the excess of educational platforms, CMSP closed after the end of the 2024 school year, on December 15. In 2025, it was replaced by the educational portal Future Classroom, which had a smaller and more balanced number of educational platforms.

== Some platforms ==
=== Digital Material ===
In April 2023, CMSP launched the Digital Material platform, designed to provide teachers and students with educational resources in formats like PDFs and editable presentations. The introduction of these digital materials was scheduled for the third term of the 2023 school year, with the goal of enhancing the overall teaching and learning experience.

In July 2023, with the rollout of digital materials, SEDUC-SP began a rapid shift towards digital teaching across the state's public school network. During this transition, the "Currículo em Ação" scholar books program was temporarily suspended to make room for the exclusively digital resources provided by CMSP. However, in high school, the program continued in the Technology and Innovation sector during the third term.

At the start of August 2023, SEDUC-SP initially opted against using the scholar books supplied by the Ministry of Education (MEC) for the upcoming 2024 school year. This decision was revisited on August 16 due to pressure from the judiciary. By October 2023, the "Currículo em Ação" books were reintroduced for both elementary and high school students, with specific volumes allocated for the fourth term. By 2024, CMSP began managing various digital platforms.

=== Leia SP ===
Leia SP, or Leia São Paulo of Odilo, was a digital reading platform of the São Paulo Media Center. It was created by the Spanish company, online library Odilo, and adopted by the São Paulo State Department of Education (SEDUC-SP) in 2024. Leia SP provided access to a diverse collection of books tailored to various educational levels, ranging from elementary school II (ensino fundamental II) to high school (ensino médio).

Leia SP was officially launched in 2024 as part of an initiative to promote literacy and reading among students in the state of São Paulo. The platform was developed by the Spanish company and online library Odilo. Upon its adoption by SEDUC-SP, Leia SP was integrated into the state's educational framework.

In the third term (bimester) of 2024, Leia SP incorporated comprehension questions into all available books. This enhancement aimed to stimulate critical thinking and give visibility to the pace and learning of students in reading.

The stated objective of Leia SP was to improve the reading skills of students within the São Paulo educational system. The platform allowed users to obtain monitoring reports on reading performance, as well as completed exercises and grades, as long as the student is in a reading club. The platform mandated that students read one book per scholar term (called "bimester" in the São Paulo state education), with weekly access to the material, and includes interactive questions related to the content being read.

== Criticism ==
Since its inception, the São Paulo Media Center faced criticism, particularly regarding accessibility. Many students struggled to access the platform due to limited internet access and device availability, leading to concerns about the inclusivity of CMSP resources. In 2023, criticism intensified with the addition of several platforms within CMSP, which experienced technical issues and inconsistencies.

One notable controversy was the Digital Material, launched in July 2023, which contained numerous errors. Critics highlighted inaccuracies in information, improper Portuguese language use, and mistakes in math operations. Examples included a slide mistakenly stating that São Paulo had a beach, citing a 1961 decree by then-mayor Jânio Quadros that banned bikinis on beaches in the city, despite São Paulo being located over 70 kilometers from the coast. Another slide incorrectly attributed the signing of the Golden Law (Lei Áurea) to Emperor Dom Pedro II, though it was actually signed by Princess Isabel. Further criticism arose when 7th-grade material claimed that contaminated water could transmit Parkinson's disease, Alzheimer's disease, and depression—a statement experts criticized for lacking scientific evidence and potentially confusing students.

Additionally, the decision to replace traditional scholar books with digital resources stirred controversy. Some educators and parents argued that digital-only materials were less accessible and potentially disruptive to learning, especially in areas with limited technological infrastructure. Another point of contention was the platform Alura Start, which was contracted for BRL 30 million without a bidding process. Furthermore, the multitude of platforms within CMSP received criticism for overwhelming students and educators, complicating navigation and integration across the educational system.

== Similarities with the SEED-PR platforms ==
Many platforms used by the São Paulo Media Center drew inspiration from those employed by the Paraná State Department of Education (SEED-PR). Notable similarities include:

- SPeak (launched May 2024) was inspired by English Paraná (Inglês Paraná, launched October 2021), both focusing on English language learning and accessed through the EF Education First website.
- Leia SP (launched February 2024) was based on Leia Paraná (launched February 2023), with both platforms promoting reading comprehension and literacy, and both were developed by the Spanish company Odilo.
- Paulista Essay (Redação Paulista, launched July 2023) mirrored Paraná Essay (Redação Paraná, launched November 2020), both designed to assist students in developing their writing skills.
- Both CMSP and SEED-PR adopted Khan Academy and Matific.
- Prova Paulista (launched March 2023) and Prova Paraná (launched February 2019) are assessment tools that share similarities, as they are conducted each academic term (trimonthly in Paraná and bimonthly in São Paulo) and evaluate the same curricular components. While Prova Paulista is conducted entirely online, Prova Paraná primarily used printed assessments, although 8th-grade students in Paraná had the option to complete it online.

== See also ==
- Prova Paulista
