= Electronic office =

The electronic office, or e-office, was a term coined to cover the increasing use of computer-based information technology for office work, especially in the 1980s. It was a popular marketing buzzword during that era, but is no longer so widely used since all modern offices are electronic offices.

The term appeared much earlier in the name of the LEO computer (Lyons Electronic Office), that first ran a business application in 1951 in England.

The general objective of e-office adoption was the elimination of paper and converting most or all office communications to electronic form.

The definition of electronic office is not precise, and it might be either:

- the introduction of individual computers running office software applications, such as word processors,
- or the interconnection of office computers using a local area network (LAN),
- or the centralization of office functions via collaborative software (i.e., groupware), which was later superseded in many contexts by web applications.

The introduction of e-office improved accuracy and efficiency of organizations and thereby improved their level of service, while theoretically lowering costs and drastically reducing the consumption of paper. Many documents are still being printed out and circulated on paper, however, especially those that require signatures or other legal formalities.
