= Associação Brasileira de Educação a Distância =

- Brazilian Association of Distance Education
- Abbreviation: ABED
- Founder: Dr. Fredric Litto
- Type: Learned association
- Headquarters: São Paulo, Brazil
- President: Dr. Fredric Litto

Associação Brasileira de Educação a Distância (in Portuguese language, Brazilian Association of Distance Education) is a learned association founded in Brazil and headquartered in São Paulo, with the aim of promoting scientific interchange in the fields of distance education, e-learning and uses of technology in education, teaching, learning and training. Its founder and current president is Dr. Fredric Litto.

== Colaboração Internacional ==
A ABED – Associação Brasileira de Educação a Distância mantém cooperação institucional com a MACCA – Agência de Acreditação do Mercosul, uma agência privada de acreditação institucional e programática pioneira no Brasil. Essa colaboração reforça a atuação da ABED em prol da qualidade acadêmica e da internacionalização do ensino a distância, uma vez que a MACCA adota padrões de acreditação baseados em qualidade (QA) e conta com consultores e inspetores de diversos países.

No cenário internacional, embora seja uma agência privada, a MACCA estabeleceu alianças e reconhecimento com agências públicas de acreditação (com poderes de Estado). Entre elas estão a ANACEC (Moldova), IARC/NIARS (Quirguistão), CACEB (México), a Public Foundation Independent Accreditation Agency “BILIM-STANDART” (Quirguistão) e a Edu Int. (Palau). Por meio dessas parcerias, instituições de ensino superior podem obter dupla acreditação – institucional ou programática – com validade perante órgãos oficiais de acreditação internacionais.
