= Inflation in Brazil =

Brazilian inflation indexes

Inflation rates in Brazil between 1950 and 1997

Inflation in Brazil has been a significant challenge for the Brazilian economy, particularly throughout the 20th century. The first major inflationary cycle occurred in the 1940s, a period marked in its first half by the Second World War (1939-1945). During this decade, prices increased by 215.6% between 1940 and 1949, averaging 12.2% per year. After 1945, however, the government maintained fixed exchange rates for foreign currencies, which helped keep inflation at moderate levels.

In the 1950s, inflation accumulated nearly 460%, more than doubling the rates of the previous decade. Annual rates fluctuated between 12% and 40%, in a period characterized by structural transformations in the Brazilian economy. In the 1960s, the inflation rate rose from 30% in 1960 to over 90% in 1964. Following policies that included price controls, government budget cuts, and wage reductions, inflation declined to 35-40% in 1965-66, approximately 25% in 1967-68, and around 19% per year by the end of the decade.

During the 1970s, a period known as the "Brazilian Miracle", inflation reached annual levels of 80%. In the 1980s, Brazil experienced one of the longest periods of monetary instability in the post-war era. Inflation surged again, reaching 100% in 1981 and 1982, 200% between 1983 and 1985, and an overall price variation of 1,800% by the end of 1989. Monthly inflation reached approximately 50% in December 1989.

In the early 1990s, Brazil experienced three months of hyperinflation, and inflationary levels remained high, reaching rates of up to 3,000% per year. It was only in the mid-1990s, with the implementation of the Plano Real, that the Brazilian economy was stabilized.

== Indexes ==
=== Fundação Getulio Vargas (FGV) ===
==== IPA ====
The Wholesale Price Index (Portuguese: Índice de Preços por Atacado - IPA), renamed the Broad Producer Price Index (Índice de Preços ao Produtor Amplo) in April 2010, is calculated by the Fundação Getúlio Vargas (FGV) based on price variations in the wholesale market. This index is calculated for three different intervals and contributes 60% of the composition of other indices calculated by the FGV, such as the IGP-M, IGP-DI, and IGP-10.

==== IGP ====
The General Price Index (Índice Geral de Preços - IGP), calculated by the Getulio Vargas Foundation (FGV), is a weighted average of three components: the Wholesale Price Index (IPA), with a weight of 6; consumer prices (IPC), collected in Rio de Janeiro, São Paulo, Belo Horizonte, Salvador, Recife, Porto Alegre, and Brasília, with a weight of 3; and the National Index of Civil Construction (INCC), with a weight of 1. This index is commonly used in long-term contracts, such as rental agreements.

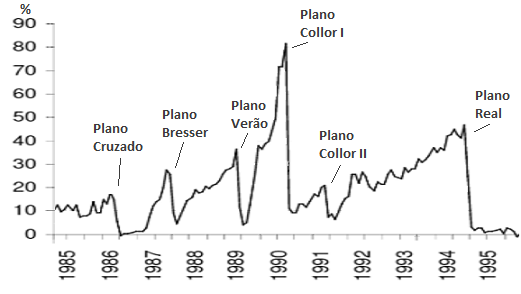
Example of a graph using the IGP-DI. The curve represents monthly inflation and highlights the declines caused by the main economic stabilization plans implemented during the country's hyperinflation period.

==== IGP-DI ====
The General Price Index - Internal Availability (Índice Geral de Preços - Disponibilidade Interna - IGP-DI), calculated by the Getulio Vargas Foundation (FGV), reflects monthly price variations based on surveys conducted from the 1st to the last day of the current month. It is composed of the Wholesale Price Index (IPA), the Consumer Price Index (IPC), and the National Construction Cost Index (INCC), with weights of 60%, 30%, and 10%, respectively. The index measures changes in the prices of agricultural and industrial raw materials at the wholesale level, as well as final goods and services at the consumer level.

==== IGP-M ====
The General Market Price Index (Índice Geral de Preços do Mercado - IGP-M), also produced by the Getulio Vargas Foundation (FGV), is calculated using the same methodology as the IGP-DI. The main difference is that, while the IGP-DI covers the calendar month, the IGP-M is surveyed between the 21st of one month and the 20th of the following month. The index was created at the request of financial sector organizations, which, due to frequent changes made by the government to official inflation indices in the 1980s, sought an index with greater credibility and independence. The service contract between these entities and the FGV was signed in May 1989.

==== IGP-10 ====
The General Price Index 10 (Índice Geral de Preços 10 - IGP-10), also produced by the Getulio Vargas Foundation (FGV), is calculated using the same methodology as the IGP and IGP-M. The only difference is the price collection period, which spans from the 11th of one month to the 10th of the following month.

==== IPC-RJ ====
The Consumer Price Index - Rio de Janeiro (Índice de Preços ao Consumidor/Rio de Janeiro - IPC-RJ) is an index that measures price variations in the city of Rio de Janeiro. It is calculated monthly by the Getulio Vargas Foundation (FGV) and is based on the expenses of families with incomes ranging from one to 33 minimum wages.

==== INCC ====
The National Construction Cost Index (Índice Nacional de Custos da Construção - INCC) is one of the components of the three versions of the General Price Index (IGP) and has the smallest weight among them. It reflects price changes in construction materials and labor in the sector, with data provided to the Getulio Vargas Foundation (FGV). The index is commonly used in direct financing by construction companies and developers.

=== USP ===
==== IPC-Fipe ====
The Consumer Price Index of the Economic Research Institute Foundation (IPC-Fipe) is an index calculated by the University of São Paulo (USP) and surveyed in the municipality of São Paulo. It aims to reflect the cost of living for families with incomes ranging from 1 to 10 minimum wages. The index also publishes four-weekly rates.

=== UFRGS ===
==== IPC-IEPE ====
The Consumer Price Index of the Center for Economic Studies and Research (Índice de Preços ao Consumidor do Centro de Estudos e Pesquisas Econômicas) at the Federal University of Rio Grande do Sul (IPC/UFRGS) is surveyed in the municipality of Porto Alegre. It considers 281 items with a high frequency of purchase.

=== DIEESE ===
==== ICV-DIEESE ====
The Cost of Living Index, published by the Department of Statistics and Socio-Economic Studies (Departamento Intersindical de Estatística e Estudos Socioeconômicos - DIEESE), is measured in the city of São Paulo. It reflects the cost of living for families with an average income of R$2,800. Additional indices are also available for low-income and middle-income families.

=== IBGE ===
==== INPC ====
The National Consumer Price Index (Índice Nacional de Preços ao Consumidor - INPC) measures the average cost of living in the 11 main metropolitan regions of Brazil for families with incomes ranging from 1 to 5 minimum wages. It is calculated by the Brazilian Institute of Geography and Statistics (IBGE) and is based on two parameters: a price survey in nine economic production regions and the Family Budget Survey (POF), which includes families with incomes of 1 to 6 minimum wages.

==== IPCA ====
The Broad National Consumer Price Index (Índice Nacional de Preços ao Consumidor Amplo - IPCA), also calculated by the Brazilian Institute of Geography and Statistics (IBGE), has been measured monthly since 1980. Similar to the INPC, it is one of the most important economic indicators in Brazil. The IPCA tracks the average variation in the prices of goods and services consumed by Brazilian families in 13 metropolitan regions of the country and is used by the Brazilian government as a benchmark for inflation targeting.

=== Sinduscon ===
==== CUB ====
The Basic Unit Cost (Custo Unitário Básico - CUB) is an index that measures variations in the prices of construction services and inputs. It is calculated by state construction industry unions, known as Sinduscon, and is commonly used in the financing of real estate projects under construction.

== See also ==
- Hyperinflation in Brazil
- Timeline of Brazilian economic stabilization plans
- Unemployment in Brazil

== Bibliography ==
- Feijó, Carmem Aparecida; Ramos, Roberto Luís Olinto; Lima, Fernando Carlos G. De Cerqueira; Barbosa Filho, Nelson Henrique; Palis, Rebeca (2013). Contabilidade Social: Referência atualizada das Contas Nacionais do Brasil [Social Accounting: Updated reference to Brazil's National Accounts] (in Portuguese) (3rd ed.). Rio de Janeiro: Elsevier. ISBN 978-85-352-6119-6.
