= Misery index (economics) =

Economic indicator measuring economic and social cost

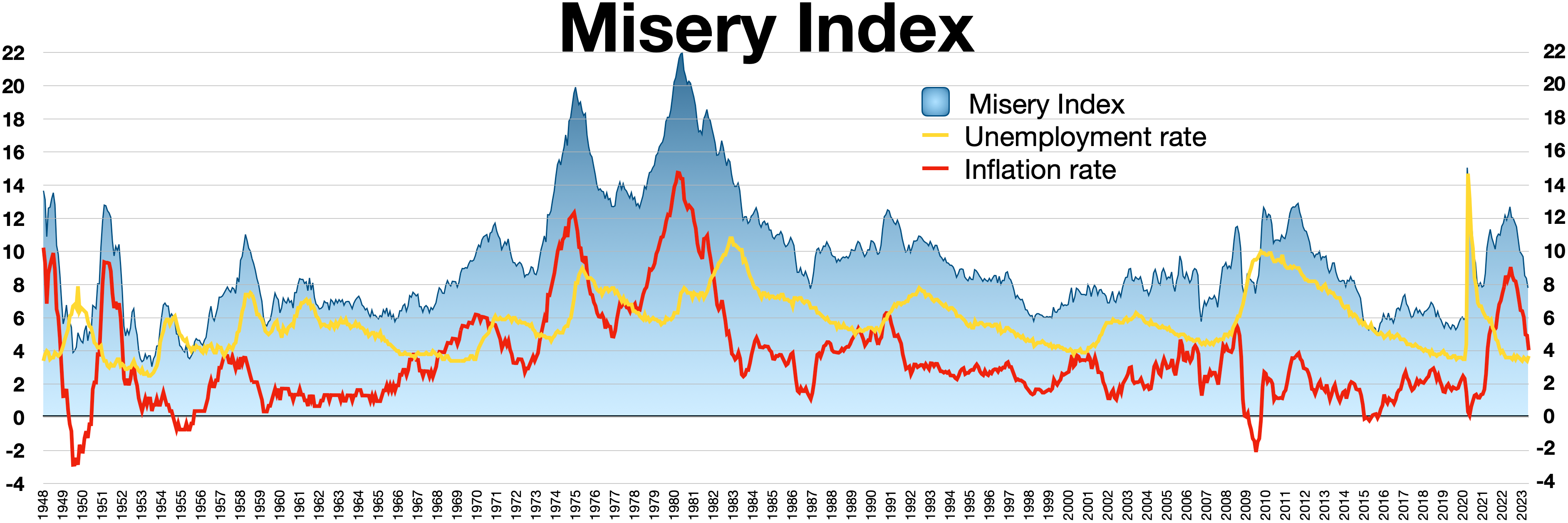
Misery Index Misery Index Unemployment rate Inflation rate CPI

The misery index is an economic indicator, created by the American economist Arthur Okun. The index helps determine how the average citizen is doing economically and is calculated by adding the seasonally adjusted unemployment rate to the annual inflation rate. It is assumed that both a higher rate of unemployment and a worsening of inflation create economic and social costs for a country.

== Misery index by US presidential administration ==
Index = Unemployment rate + Inflation rate (lower number is better)
President	Time Period	Average	Low	High	Start	End	Change
Harry Truman	1948–1952	7.88	3.45 – Dec 1952	13.63 – Jan 1948	13.63	3.45	-10.18
Dwight D. Eisenhower	1953–1960	9.26	2.97 – Jul 1953	10.98 – Apr 1958	3.28	9.96	+5.68
John F. Kennedy	1961–1963	7.14	6.40 – Jul 1962	8.38 – Jul 1961	8.31	6.82	-1.49
Lyndon B. Johnson	1963–1968	6.77	5.70 – Nov 1965	8.19 – Jul 1968	7.02	8.12	+1.10
Richard Nixon	1969–1974	10.57	7.80 – Jan 1969	17.01 – Jul 1974	7.80	17.01	+9.21
Gerald Ford	1974–1976	16.00	12.66 – Dec 1976	19.90 – Jan 1975	16.36	12.66	-3.70
Jimmy Carter	1977–1980	16.26	12.60 – Apr 1978	21.98 – Jun 1980	12.72	19.72	+7.00
Ronald Reagan	1981–1988	12.19	7.70 – Dec 1986	19.33 – Jan 1981	19.33	9.72	-9.61
George H. W. Bush	1989–1992	10.68	9.64 – Sep 1989	14.47 – Nov 1990	10.07	10.30	+0.23
Bill Clinton	1993–2000	7.80	5.74 – Apr 1998	10.56 – Jan 1993	10.56	7.29	-3.27
George W. Bush	2001–2008	8.11	5.71 – Oct 2006	11.47 – Aug 2008	7.93	7.39	-0.54
Barack Obama	2009–2016	8.83	5.06 – Sep 2015	12.87 – Sep 2011	7.83	6.77	-1.06
Donald Trump	2017–2020	6.91	5.21 – Sep 2019	15.03 – Apr 2020	7.30	8.06	+0.76
Joe Biden	2021– January 2025	10.16	6.79 – Feb 2024	11.29 – Jun 2021	7.70	7	-0.7

== Variations ==
Harvard Economist Robert Barro created what he dubbed the "Barro Misery Index" (BMI), in 1999. The BMI takes the sum of the inflation and unemployment rates, and adds to that the interest rate, plus (minus) the shortfall (surplus) between the actual and trend rate of GDP growth.

In the late 2000s, Johns Hopkins economist Steve Hanke built upon Barro's misery index and began applying it to countries beyond the United States. His modified misery index is the sum of the interest, inflation, and unemployment rates, minus the year-over-year percent change in per-capita GDP growth.

In 2013 Hanke constructed a World Table of Misery Index Scores by exclusively relying on data reported by the Economist Intelligence Unit. This table includes a list of 89 countries, ranked from worst to best, with data as of December 31, 2013 (see table below).

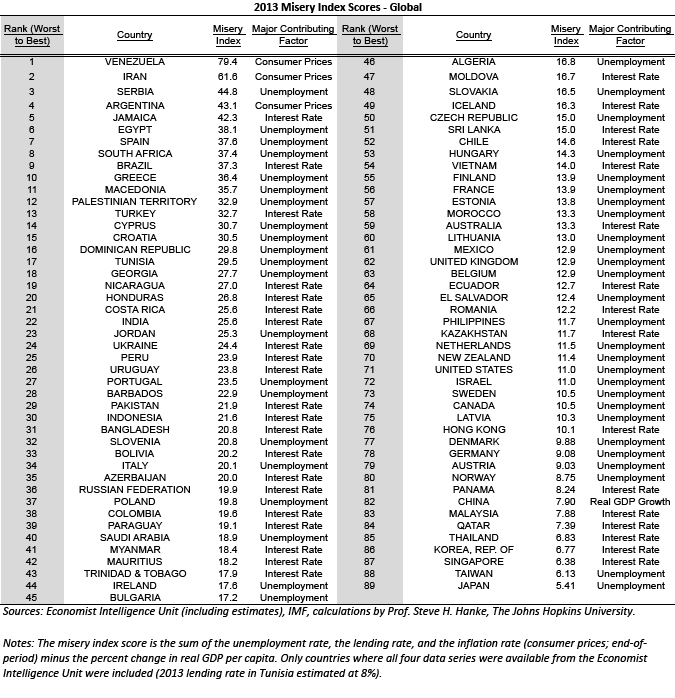
World Table of Misery Index Scores as of December 31, 2013.

Political economists Jonathan Nitzan and Shimshon Bichler found a negative correlation between a similar "stagflation index" and corporate amalgamation (i.e. mergers and acquisitions) in the United States since the 1930s. In their theory, stagflation is a form of political economic sabotage employed by corporations to achieve differential accumulation, in this case as an alternative to amalgamation when merger and acquisition opportunities have run out.

== Hanke's Misery Index ==
Ranked from worst to best
Country/Territory	2020	2022			
Country/Territory	2020	2022	Venezuela	3827.6	330.8
Zimbabwe	547.0	414.7			
Syria	N/A	225.4			
Yemen	N/A	116.2			
Ghana	N/A	86.8			
Barbados	N/A	31.5			
Sudan	193.9	176.1			
Lebanon	177.1	190.337			
Suriname	145.3	80.5			
Libya	105.7	60.3			
Argentina	95.0	156.192			
Iran	92.1	73.3			
Angola	60.6	93.518			
Madagascar	60.4	63.6			
Brazil	53.4	61.785			
South Africa	49.3	83.492			
Haiti	48.9	95.4			
Kyrgyzstan	47.1	40.977			
Nigeria	45.6	47.2			
Eswatini	42.7	63.1			
Lesotho	42.4	51.6			
Peru	42.2	34.835			
Zambia	41.6	32			
South Sudan	41.2	176.1			
Turkey	41.2	101.601			
Namibia	40.7	55.7			
Gabon	40.5	62.4			
Congo	40.3	61.5			
Botswana	39.7	64.023			
Iraq	39.5	42.3			
São Tomé and Príncipe	39.3	62.3			
Liberia	39.1	26.32			
Jamaica	38.6	41			
Malawi	37.9	63.5			
Jordan	37.9	56.3			
Guinea	36.8	38.9			
Uruguay	36.7	30.296			
Armenia	36.7	33.7			
Montenegro	36.2	52.653			
Tunisia	36.1	46.905			
Ethiopia	36.1	61			
Honduras	35.8	42.2			
India	35.8	22.58			
Panama	35.7	19.21			
Colombia	35.4	44.531			
Mongolia	35.4	42.98			
Georgia	34.8	52.5			
Uzbekistan	34.1	44.4			
Dominican Republic	34.0	27.2			
Ukraine	33.5	110.003			
Saudi Arabia	33.1	24.603			
Algeria	32.7	50.2			
Pakistan	32.5	52.6			
Costa Rica	32.4	37.077			
Paraguay	32.0	43.7			
Trinidad and Tobago	31.5	21.98			
Greece	31.3	31.128			
Mauritius	30.4	29.884			
Gambia	30.2	41.2			
Cape Verde	29.9	26.3			
Bolivia	29.9	18.9			
Kazakhstan	29.5	43.854			
Guatemala	29.3	26.3			
Burundi	28.7	41			
Philippines	28.3	19.552			
Azerbaijan	28.2	38.131			
Spain	28.2	28.16			
North Macedonia	28.1	50.4			
Belize	27.8				
Democratic Republic of the Congo	27.4	38.64			
Equatorial Guinea	27.1	31.8			
Comoros	26.2	37.1			
Myanmar	26.2	50.4			
El Salvador	26.0	28.4			
Mozambique	25.8	36.9			
Nicaragua	25.7	18.725			
Mexico	25.6	20.3			
Sri Lanka	24.3	99.634			
Chile	23.9	36.846			
Albania	23.8	25.6			
Bosnia and Herzegovina	23.8	75.9			
Iceland	23.5	21.525			
Ecuador	23.3	17.5			
Fiji	23.2	17.5			
Mauritania	23.2	45.4			
Morocco	22.8	36.565			
New Zealand	22.2	22.441			
Belarus	22.0	39.2			
Italy	22.0	26.451			
Oman	21.6	11.3			
United Kingdom	22.5	17.659			
Egypt	20.9	41.832			
Indonesia	20.9	21.727			
Kenya	20.8	29.264			
Vanuatu	20.4	18.3			
Kuwait	20.3	8.6			
Papua New Guinea	20.1	18			
Russia	19.9	33.202			
Nepal	19.9	37.18			
Romania	18.5	32.271			
Serbia	18.4	41.138			
France	18.4	19.935			
Croatia	18.3	25.5			
Hong Kong	18.2	18.191			
Canada	18.1	20.676			
Malta	18.0	11.062			
Portugal	18.0	18.615			
Uganda	17.6	35.235			
Mali	17.5	32.7			
Estonia	17.1	34.692			
Latvia	17.1	35.49			
Slovenia	17.0	19.919			
United States	16.7	16.882			
Moldova	16.4	52.9			
Cyprus	16.3	20.6			
Slovakia	16.2	32.051			
Bulgaria	16.0	24.6			
Laos	16.0	52.16			
Australia	15.9	20.059			
Burkina Faso	15.9	26.3			
Cuba	15.8	102			
Czech Republic	15.7	22.2			
Cameroon	15.5	19			
Belgium	15.4	20.608			
Hungary	14.8	40.242			
Singapore	14.6	15.986			
Austria	14.5	17.063			
Lithuania	14.5	32.87			
Malaysia	14.5	9.075			
Guinea-Bissau	14.4	17.2			
Israel	14.4	12.384			
Luxembourg	14.3	18.316			
Bangladesh	14.0	20.107			
Poland	13.9	33.761			
Vietnam	13.4	14.839			
Bahrain	13.2	22.2			
Central African Republic	13.2	35.4			
Netherlands	13.0	14.973			
Ireland	12.9	8.602			
Finland	12.8	21.629			
Norway	12.8	13.542			
Sweden	12.7	29.198			
Thailand	12.6	10.219			
Denmark	11.8	15.785			
United Arab Emirates	11.8	13			
Tanzania	11.6	25.132			
Chad	11.6	23.34			
Tonga	11.4	88.1			
Germany	10.9	16.381			
Côte d'Ivoire	10.8	11.622			
Rwanda	10.6	69.192			
Niger	10.5	9.77			
Togo	9.5	10.95			
Switzerland	8.6	8.518			
South Korea	8.3	12.515			
China	8.3	13.1			
Japan	8.1	9.071			
Qatar	5.3	13.591			
Taiwan	3.8	9.399			
Guyana	−3.3				

== Criticism ==
A 2001 paper looking at large-scale surveys in Europe and the United States concluded that unemployment more heavily influences unhappiness than inflation. This implies that the basic misery index underweights the unhappiness attributable to the unemployment rate: "the estimates suggest that people would trade off a 1-percentage-point increase in the employment rate for a 1.7-percentage-point increase in the inflation rate."

== Misery and crime ==
Some economists, such as Hooi Hooi Lean, posit that the components of the Misery Index drive the crime rate to a degree. Using data from 1960 to 2005, they have found that the Misery Index and the crime rate correlate strongly and that the Misery Index seems to lead the crime rate by a year or so. In fact, the correlation is so strong that the two can be said to be cointegrated, and stronger than correlation with either the unemployment rate or inflation rate alone.

== Data sources ==
The data for the misery index is obtained from unemployment data published by the U.S. Department of Labor (U3) and the Inflation Rate (CPI-U) from the Bureau of Labor Statistics. The exact methods used for measuring unemployment and inflation have changed over time, although past data is usually normalized so that past and future metrics are comparable.

== See also ==
- Elder Index
