= Stagflation =

High inflation, low economic growth, and high unemployment

Stagflation is the combination of high inflation, stagnant economic growth, and elevated unemployment. The term stagflation, a portmanteau of "stagnation" and "inflation", was popularized and probably coined by British politician Iain Macleod in the 1960s, during a period of economic distress in the United Kingdom. It gained broader recognition in the 1970s after a series of global economic shocks, such as the closure of the Suez Canal (1967–1975) and the 1973 oil crisis, which disrupted supply chains and led to rising prices and slowing growth. Stagflation challenges traditional economic theories, which suggest that inflation and unemployment are inversely related, as depicted by the Phillips Curve.

Stagflation presents a policy dilemma, as measures to curb inflation—such as tightening monetary policy—can exacerbate unemployment, while policies aimed at reducing unemployment may fuel inflation. In economic theory, there are two main explanations for stagflation: supply shocks, such as a sharp increase in oil prices, and misguided government policies that hinder industrial output while expanding the money supply too rapidly. The stagflation of the 1970s led to a reevaluation of Keynesian economic policies and contributed to the rise of alternative economic theories, including monetarism and supply-side economics.

== Etymology ==
The term, a portmanteau of stagnation and inflation, is generally attributed to Iain Macleod, a British Conservative Party politician who became Chancellor of the Exchequer in 1970. Macleod used the word in a 1965 speech to Parliament during a period of simultaneously high inflation and unemployment in the United Kingdom. Warning the House of Commons of the gravity of the situation, he said:

We now have the worst of both worlds—not just inflation on the one side or stagnation on the other, but both of them together. We have a sort of "stagflation" situation. And history, in modern terms, is indeed being made.

Macleod used the term again on 7 July 1970, and the media began also to use it, for example in The Economist on 15 August 1970, and Newsweek on 19 March 1973. John Maynard Keynes did not use the term, but some of his work refers to the conditions that most would recognise as stagflation.

== 1976 Sterling crisis ==
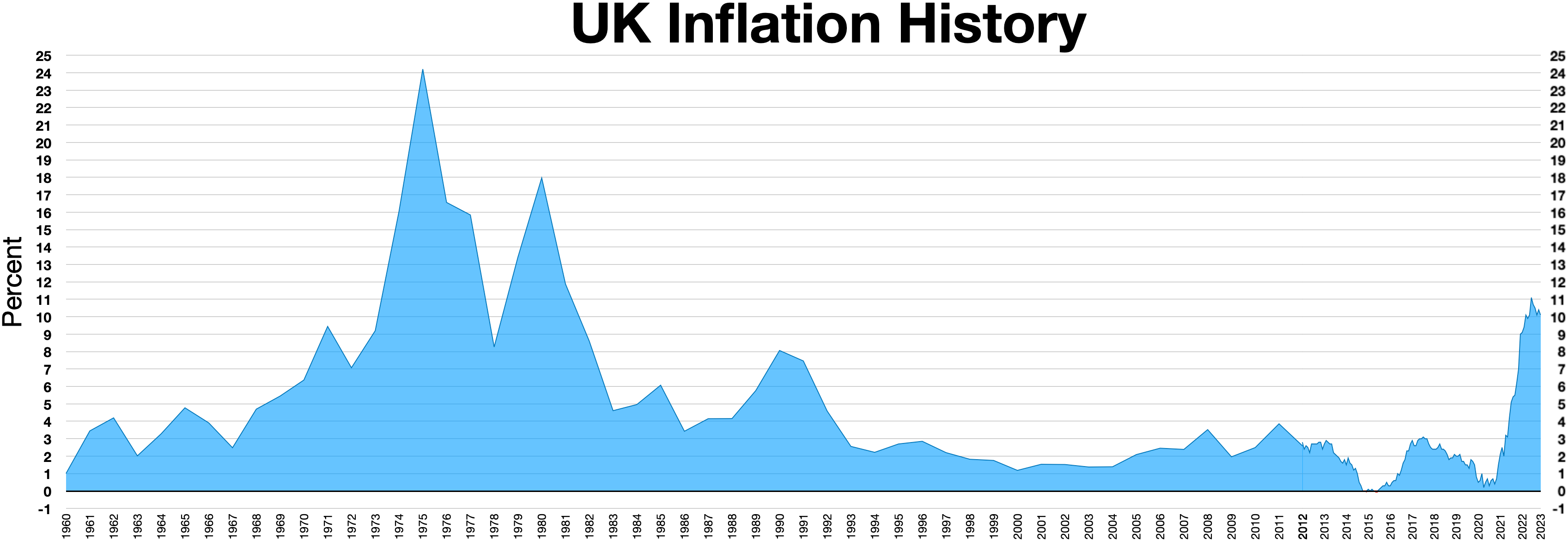
UK inflation history

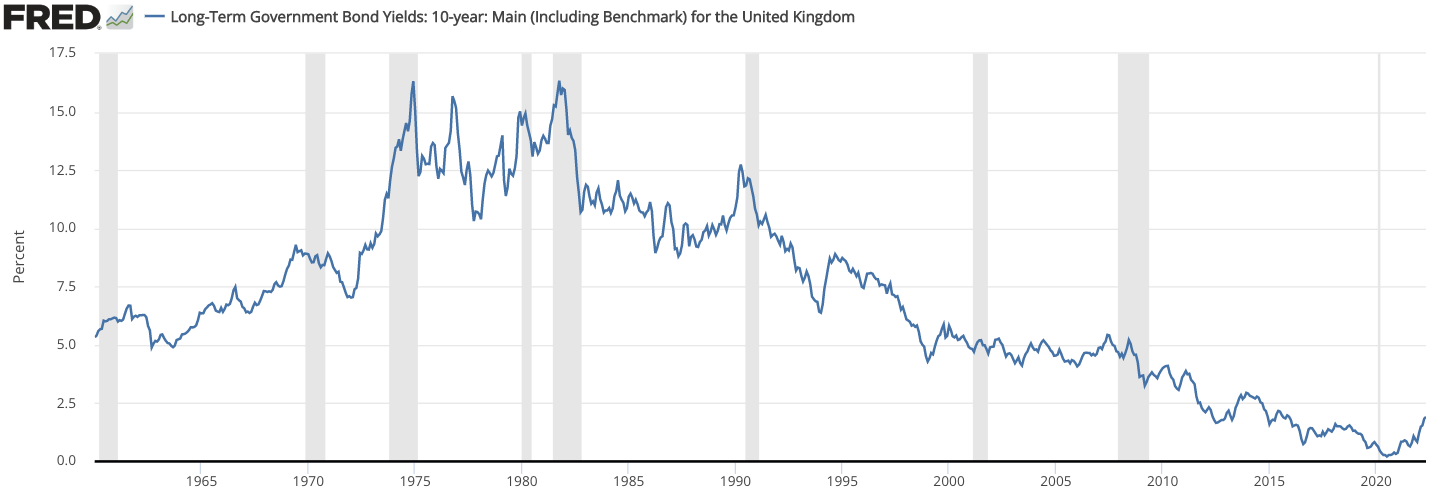
10 year UK bond Borrowing costs for debt and bonds were elevated from inflation as well.

The United Kingdom experienced an outbreak of inflation in the 1960s and 1970s. As inflation rose, British policy makers failed to recognise the primary role of monetary policy in controlling inflation. They tried to use non-monetary policies and devices to respond to the economic crisis. Policy makers also made "inaccurate estimates of the degree of excess demand in the economy, [which] contributed significantly to the outbreak of inflation in the United Kingdom in the 1960s and 1970s."

Stagflation was not limited to the United Kingdom. Economists have shown that stagflation was prevalent among seven major market economies from 1973 to 1982. After inflation rates began to fall in 1982, economists' focus shifted from the causes of stagflation to the "determinants of productivity growth and the effects of real wages on the demand for labor".

== Causes ==
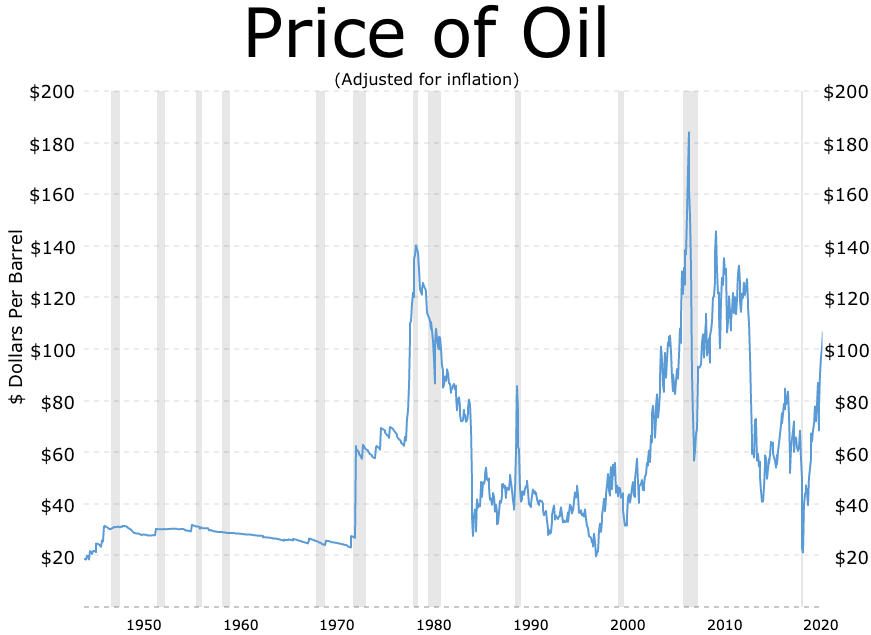
1973 oil crisis caused an increase in the price of Brent Crude.

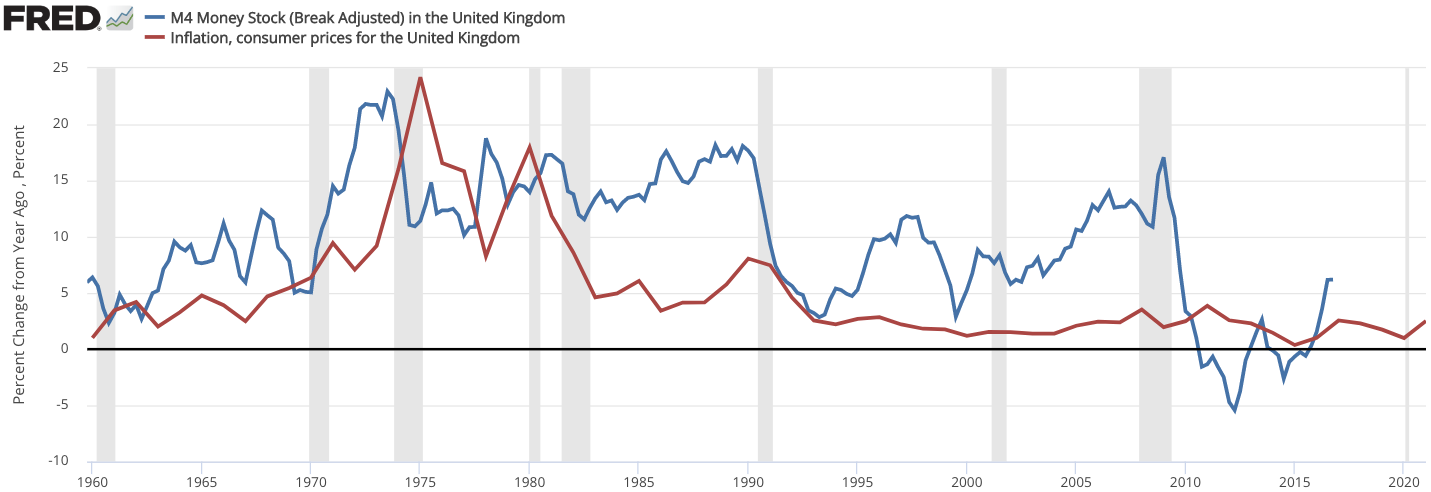
UK M4 Money Supply Increases UK Inflation

Economists offer two principal explanations for why stagflation occurs. First, stagflation can result when the economy faces a negative supply shock, such as a rapid increase in the price of oil. An unfavourable situation like that tends to raise prices at the same time as it slows economic growth by making production more costly and less profitable.

Second, the government can cause stagflation if it creates policies that harm industry while growing the money supply too quickly. These two things would probably have to occur together because policies that slow economic growth rarely cause inflation, and policies that cause inflation rarely slow economic growth.

=== Supply shock ===
As soon as the Six-Day War started in 1967 and Israel invaded the Sinai Peninsula down to the Suez Canal, the Egyptian President Gamal Abdel Nasser, who was aligning with the Soviet Union, closed down the Suez Canal for eight years. Oil from the Middle East to Europe had to be rerouted around Africa. Egypt then tried to cross the Suez Canal and take back the Sinai Peninsula in the Yom Kippur War in late 1973. Richard Nixon supported funding Israel with $2.2 billion over the conflict, which triggered an oil embargo in October 1973 when the countries of the Organization of Arab Petroleum Exporting Countries (OAPEC) cut production of oil and placed an embargo on oil exports to the United States and other countries backing Israel.

=== Excess demand ===
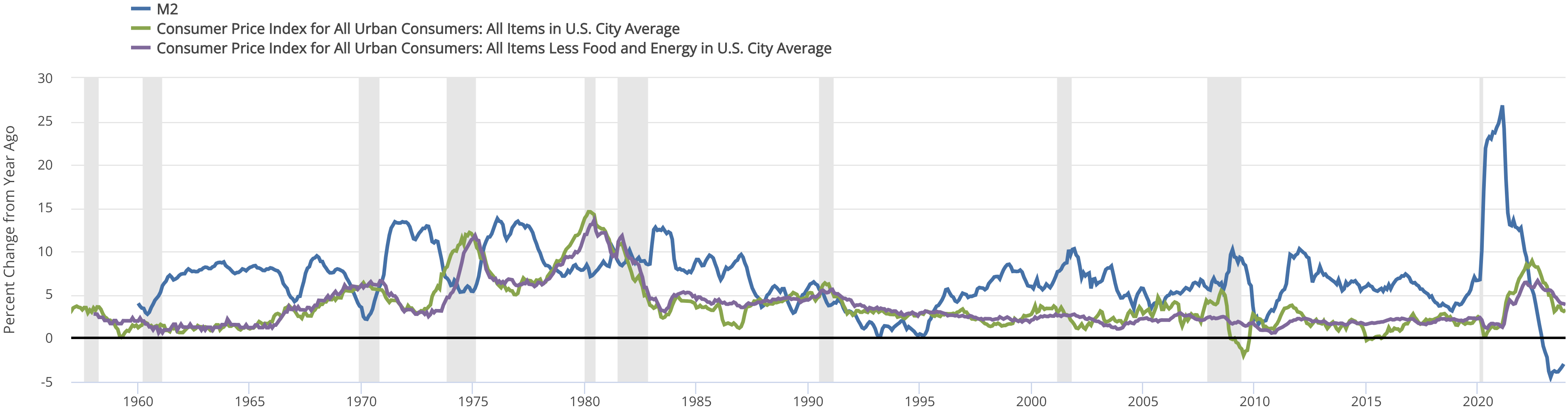
(Percent change from a year earlier) M2 money supply CPI Core CPI

Money supply in the early 1970s increased at almost 15% year over year in the United States and the Consumer price index lags behind about one year or two. Britain's monetary policy was also dovish causing excess demand.

=== End of Bretton Woods system ===
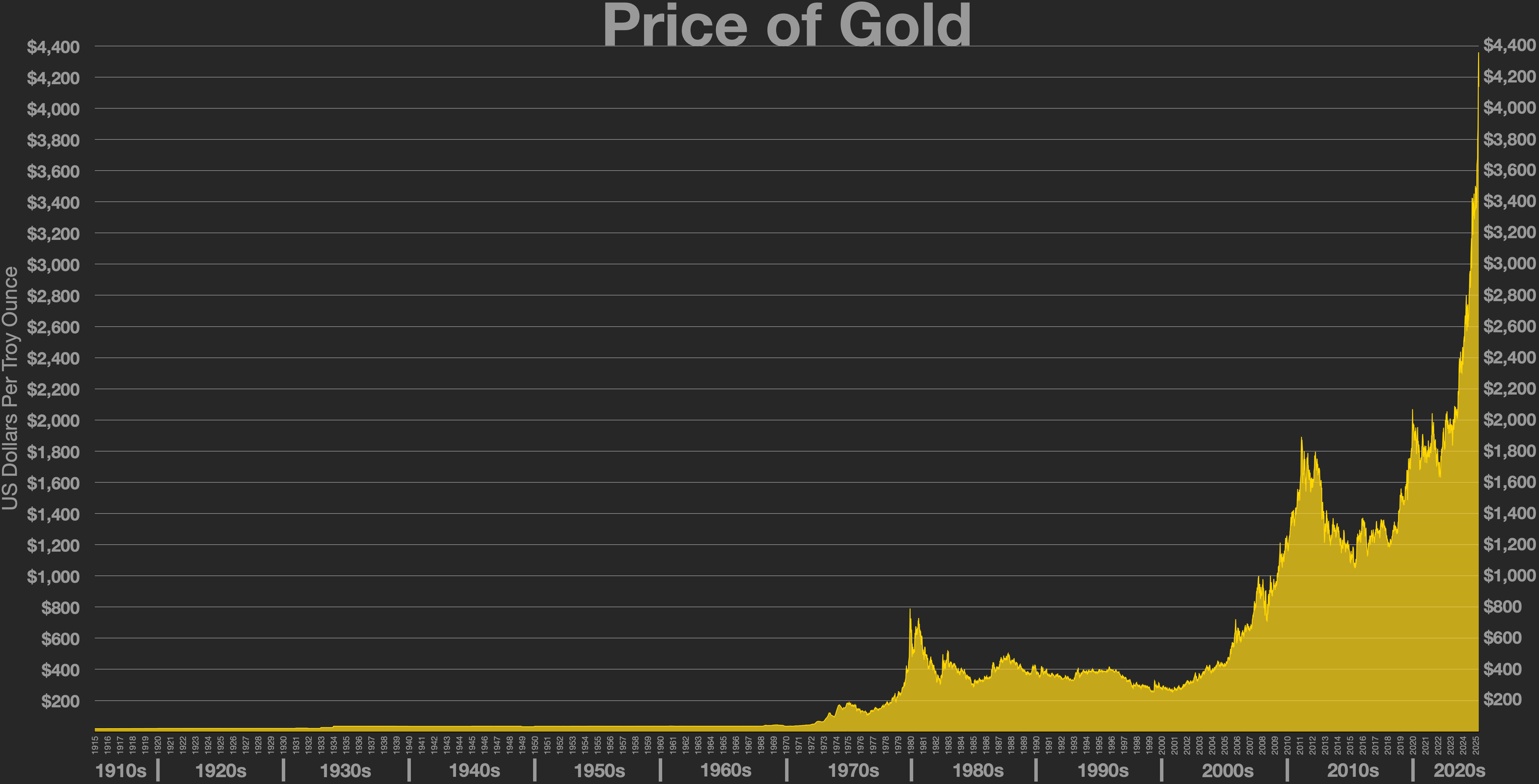
Price of gold 1915-2022

In the mid 1970s, the Bretton Woods system was failing. The fixed exchange rate between countries' currencies started to float, and the gold standard, under which currencies were pegged to gold, was abandoned. After many years of stability, the price of gold and oil became very volatile.

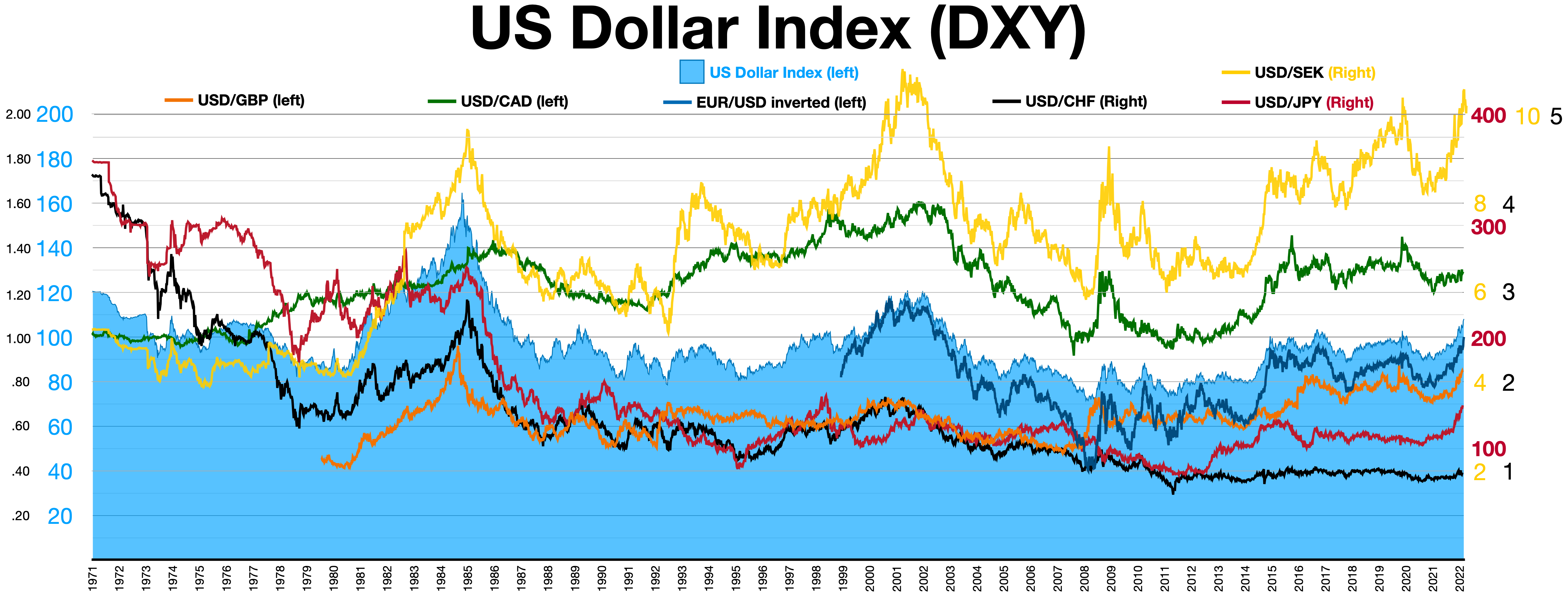
US Dollar Index (DXY) In the early 1970s, this graph shows some currencies at fixed exchange rates before floating against each other: USD/GBP exchange rate USD/Canadian dollar exchange rate EUR/USD (inverted) exchange rate USD/JPY exchange rate USD/SEK exchange rate USD/CHF exchange rate

=== Other reasons ===
There is evidence supporting the second explanation against the supply shock view that the 1970s stagflation was due to OPEC's quadrupling of oil prices in October 1973. Data show that its seeds were sown during the late 1960s and began to be reaped in that decade. Between 1968 and 1970 unemployment rose from 3.6% to 4.9% while the CPI inflation rose from 4.7% to 5.6%. Further in the Michigan survey expected inflation rose from 3.8% to 4.9% between 1967 and 1970. The rise in expected inflation strongly supports the view that Expected Augmented Phillips Curve (EAPC) can explain the early, mild stagflation. Although the weakening economy was putting some downward pressure on inflation overall inflation rose in accordance with EAPC, as expected inflation kept rising. The stagflation became more severe in the early 1970s but was suppressed by the price controls and wage freeze imposed by President Nixon starting in August 1971 and through 1972. But when the controls were lifted in mid-1973 the CPI surged to 8.5%. Arguably, if there were no wage-price controls, the mini stagflation documented above would have been clearly evident before the October 1973 OPEC oil price hike.

As for the direct impact of dollar depreciation on inflation, data again imply that just as higher inflation shifted up the labor supply curve and made workers demand and get higher money wages, similarly a falling dollar made commodity producers demand higher prices to compensate for the dollar decline. Further, the weakening of the dollar, while exogeneous to oil prices, was itself a delayed response to rising inflation from 1968 onwards. This pattern of an overheated economy, leading to inflation, dollar depreciation, and then to higher oil prices and another bout of stagflation repeated itself in 1979.

Both explanations are offered in analyses of the 1970s stagflation in the West. It began with a large rise in oil prices, but then continued as central banks used excessively stimulative monetary policy to counteract the resulting recession, thereby causing a price/wage spiral.

Increased requirements on skill (education and experience) on work force, for example because of increased technical complexity, can cause shortage on skilled employees and rising salaries for them, at the same time as uneducated work tasks have in part moved to low salary countries such as in Asia, causing high unemployment.

== Postwar Keynesian and monetarist views ==
=== Early Keynesianism and monetarism ===
Up to the 1960s, many Keynesian economists ignored the possibility of stagflation, because history suggested high unemployment correlated with low inflation, and vice versa (the Phillips curve). The idea was that high demand for goods drives up prices and encourages firms to hire more; and high employment raises demand. However, in the 1970s and 1980s, when stagflation occurred, it became clear that the relationship between inflation and employment levels was not necessarily stable: that is, the Phillips relationship could shift. Macroeconomists became more sceptical of Keynesian theories, and Keynesians reconsidered their ideas in search of an explanation for stagflation.

Explanations for the shift of the Phillips curve were initially provided by the monetarist economist Milton Friedman, and also by Edmund Phelps. Both argued that when workers and firms expect more inflation, the Phillips curve shifts up (meaning that more inflation occurs at any given level of unemployment). In particular, they suggested that if inflation lasted for several years, workers and firms would start to take it into account during wage negotiations, causing workers' wages and firms' costs to rise more quickly, thus further increasing inflation. While this idea was a criticism of early Keynesian theories, it was gradually accepted by most Keynesians, and has been incorporated into New Keynesian economic models.

=== Neo-Keynesianism ===
Neo-Keynesian theory distinguished two distinct kinds of inflation: demand-pull (caused by shifts of the aggregate demand curve) and cost-push (caused by shifts of the aggregate supply curve). Stagflation, in this view, is caused by cost-push inflation. Cost-push inflation occurs when some force or condition increases the costs of production. This could be caused by government policies (such as taxes) or from purely external factors such as a shortage of natural resources or an act of war.

Contemporary Keynesian analyses argue that stagflation can be understood by distinguishing factors that affect aggregate demand from those that affect aggregate supply. While monetary and fiscal policy can be used to stabilise the economy in the face of aggregate demand fluctuations, they are not very useful in confronting aggregate supply fluctuations. In particular, an adverse shock to aggregate supply, such as an increase in oil prices, can give rise to stagflation.

=== Supply theory ===
==== Fundamentals ====
Supply theories are based on the neo-Keynesian cost-push model and attribute stagflation to large disruptions to the supply side of the supply-demand market equation, such as when there is a sudden scarcity of key commodities, natural resources, or the natural capital needed to produce goods and services. In this view, stagflation is thought to occur when there is an adverse supply shock (for example, a sudden increase in the price of oil or a new tax) that causes a subsequent jump in the "cost" of goods and services (often at the wholesale level). In technical terms, this leads to contraction or negative shift in an economy's aggregate supply curve.

In the resource scarcity scenario (Zinam 1982), stagflation results when a restricted supply of raw materials inhibits economic growth. That is, when the supply of basic materials (fossil fuels (energy), minerals, agricultural land in production, timber, etc.) decreases and/or cannot rise fast enough to respond to demand. The resource shortage may be real or relative due to factors such as taxes or bad monetary policy influencing the "cost" or availability of raw materials. This is consistent with the cost-push inflation factors in neo-Keynesian theory (above). After supply shock occurs, the economy tries to maintain momentum. That is, consumers and businesses begin paying higher prices to maintain their level of demand. The central bank may exacerbate this by increasing the money supply, by lowering interest rates for example, in an effort to combat a recession. The increased money supply props up the demand for goods and services, though demand would normally drop during a recession.

In the Keynesian model, higher prices prompt increases in the supply of goods and services. However, during a supply shock (i.e., scarcity, "bottleneck" in resources, etc.), supplies do not respond as they normally would to these price pressures. So, inflation jumps and output drops, producing stagflation.

==== Explaining the 1970s stagflation ====
Following Richard Nixon's imposition of wage and price controls on 15 August 1971, an initial wave of cost-push shocks in commodities were blamed for causing spiraling prices. The second major shock was the 1973 oil crisis, when the Organization of Petroleum Exporting Countries (OPEC) constrained the worldwide supply of oil. Both events, combined with the overall energy shortage that characterised the 1970s, resulted in actual or relative scarcity of raw materials. The price controls resulted in shortages at the point of purchase, causing, for example, queues of consumers at fuelling stations and increased production costs for industry.

== Recent views ==
Through the mid-1970s, it was alleged that none of the major macroeconomic models (Keynesian, new classical, and monetarist) was able to explain stagflation.

Later, an explanation was provided based on the effects of adverse supply shocks on both inflation and output. According to Blanchard (2009), these adverse events were one of two components of stagflation; the other was "ideas"—which Robert Lucas, Thomas Sargent, and Robert Barro were cited as expressing as "wildly incorrect" and "fundamentally flawed" predictions (of Keynesian economics) which, they said, left stagflation to be explained by "contemporary students of the business cycle". In this discussion, Blanchard hypothesizes that the recent oil price increases could trigger another period of stagflation, although this has not yet happened (pg. 152).

== Neoclassical views ==
A purely neoclassical view of the macroeconomy rejects the idea that monetary policy can have real effects. Neoclassical macroeconomists argue that real economic quantities, like real output, employment, and unemployment, are determined by real factors only. Nominal factors like changes in the money supply only affect nominal variables like inflation. The neoclassical idea that nominal factors cannot have real effects is often called monetary neutrality or also the classical dichotomy.

Since the neoclassical viewpoint says that real phenomena like unemployment are essentially unrelated to nominal phenomena like inflation, a neoclassical economist would offer two separate explanations for "stagnation" and "inflation". Neoclassical explanations of stagnation (low growth and high unemployment) include inefficient government regulations or high benefits for the unemployed that give people less incentive to look for jobs. Another neoclassical explanation of stagnation is given by real business cycle theory, in which any decrease in labour productivity makes it efficient to work less. The main neoclassical explanation of inflation is very simple: it happens when the monetary authorities increase the money supply too much.

In the neoclassical viewpoint, the real factors that determine output and unemployment affect the aggregate supply curve only. The nominal factors that determine inflation affect the aggregate demand curve only. When some adverse changes in real factors are shifting the aggregate supply curve left at the same time that unwise monetary policies are shifting the aggregate demand curve right, the result is stagflation.

Thus the main explanation for stagflation under a classical view of the economy is simply policy errors that affect both inflation and the labour market. Ironically, a very clear argument in favour of the classical explanation of stagflation was provided by Keynes himself. In 1919, John Maynard Keynes described the inflation and economic stagnation gripping Europe in his book The Economic Consequences of the Peace. Keynes wrote:

Lenin is said to have declared that the best way to destroy the Capitalist System was to debauch the currency. By a continuing process of inflation, governments can confiscate, secretly and unobserved, an important part of the wealth of their citizens. By this method they not only confiscate, but they confiscate arbitrarily; and, while the process impoverishes many, it actually enriches some. [...] Lenin was certainly right. There is no subtler, no surer means of overturning the existing basis of society than to debauch the currency. The process engages all the hidden forces of economic law on the side of destruction, and does it in a manner which not one man in a million is able to diagnose.

Keynes explicitly pointed out the relationship between governments printing money and inflation.

The inflationism of the currency systems of Europe has proceeded to extraordinary lengths. The various belligerent Governments, unable, or too timid or too short-sighted to secure from loans or taxes the resources they required, have printed notes for the balance.

Keynes also pointed out how government price controls discourage production.

The presumption of a spurious value for the currency, by the force of law expressed in the regulation of prices, contains in itself, however, the seeds of final economic decay, and soon dries up the sources of ultimate supply. If a man is compelled to exchange the fruits of his labours for paper which, as experience soon teaches him, he cannot use to purchase what he requires at a price comparable to that which he has received for his own products, he will keep his produce for himself, dispose of it to his friends and neighbours as a favour, or relax his efforts in producing it. A system of compelling the exchange of commodities at what is not their real relative value not only relaxes production, but leads finally to the waste and inefficiency of barter.

Keynes detailed the relationship between German government deficits and inflation.

In Germany the total expenditure of the Empire, the Federal States, and the Communes in 1919–20 is estimated at 25 milliards of marks, of which not above 10 milliards are covered by previously existing taxation. This is without allowing anything for the payment of the indemnity. In Russia, Poland, Hungary, or Austria such a thing as a budget cannot be seriously considered to exist at all. Thus the menace of inflationism described above is not merely a product of the war, of which peace begins the cure. It is a continuing phenomenon of which the end is not yet in sight.

=== Zimmermann conclusion ===
While most economists believe that changes in money supply can have some real effects in the short run, neoclassical and neo-Keynesian economists tend to agree that there are no long-run effects from changing the money supply. Therefore, even economists who consider themselves neo-Keynesians usually believe that in the long run, money is neutral. In other words, while neoclassical and neo-Keynesian models are often seen as competing points of view, they can also be seen as two descriptions appropriate for different time horizons. Many mainstream textbooks today treat the neo-Keynesian model as a more appropriate description of the economy in the short run, when prices are "sticky", and treat the neoclassical model as a more appropriate description of the economy in the long run, when prices have sufficient time to adjust fully.

Therefore, while mainstream economists today might often attribute short periods of stagflation (not more than a few years) to adverse changes in supply, they would not accept this as an explanation of very prolonged stagflation. More prolonged stagflation would be explained as the effect of inappropriate government policies: excessive regulation of product markets and labour markets leading to long-run stagnation, and excessive growth of the money supply leading to long-run inflation.

== Alternative views ==
=== As differential accumulation ===
Political economists Jonathan Nitzan and Shimshon Bichler have proposed an explanation of stagflation as part of a theory they call differential accumulation, which says firms seek to beat the average profit and capitalisation rather than maximise. According to this theory, periods of mergers and acquisitions oscillate with periods of stagflation. When mergers and acquisitions are no longer politically feasible (governments clamp down with anti-monopoly rules), stagflation is used as an alternative to have higher relative profit than the competition. With increasing mergers and acquisitions, the power to implement stagflation increases.

Stagflation appears as a societal crisis, such as during the period of the oil crisis in the 70s and in 2007 to 2010. Inflation in stagflation, however, does not affect all firms equally. Dominant firms are able to increase their own prices at a faster rate than competitors. While in the aggregate no one appears to profit, differentially dominant firms improve their positions with higher relative profits and higher relative capitalisation. Stagflation is not due to any actual supply shock, but because of the societal crisis that hints at a supply crisis. It is mostly a 20th and 21st century phenomenon that has been mainly used by the "weapondollar-petrodollar coalition" creating or using Middle East crises for the benefit of pecuniary interests.

=== Demand-pull stagflation theory ===
Demand-pull stagflation theory explores the idea that stagflation can result exclusively from monetary shocks without any concurrent supply shocks or negative shifts in economic output potential. Demand-pull theory describes a scenario where stagflation can occur following a period of monetary policy implementations that cause inflation. This theory was first proposed in 1999 by Eduardo Loyo of Harvard University's John F. Kennedy School of Government.

=== Supply-side theory ===
Supply-side economics emerged as a response to US stagflation in the 1970s. It largely attributed inflation to the ending of the Bretton Woods system in 1971 and the lack of a specific price reference in the subsequent monetary policies (Keynesian and Monetarism). Supply-side economists asserted that the contraction component of stagflation resulted from an inflation-induced rise in real tax rates (see bracket creep).

=== Austrian School of economics ===
Adherents to the Austrian School maintain that creation of new money ex nihilo benefits the creators and early recipients of the new money relative to late recipients. Money creation is not wealth creation; it merely allows early money recipients to outbid late recipients for resources, goods, and services. Since the actual producers of wealth are typically late recipients, increases in the money supply weakens wealth formation and undermines the rate of economic growth. Austrian economist Frank Shostak says: "The increase in the money supply rate of growth coupled with the slowdown in the rate of growth of goods produced is what the increase in the rate of price inflation is all about. (Note that a price is the amount of money paid for a unit of a good.) What we have here is a faster increase in price inflation and a decline in the rate of growth in the production of goods. But this is exactly what stagflation is all about, i.e., an increase in price inflation and a fall in real economic growth. Popular opinion is that stagflation is totally made up. It seems therefore that the phenomenon of stagflation is the normal outcome of loose monetary policy. This is in agreement with Phelps and Friedman (PF). Contrary to PF, however, we maintain that stagflation is not caused by the fact that in the short run people are fooled by the central bank. Stagflation is the natural result of monetary pumping which weakens the pace of economic growth and at the same time raises the rate of increase of the prices of goods and services."

=== Jane Jacobs and the influence of cities on stagflation ===
In 1984, journalist and activist Jane Jacobs proposed the failure of major macroeconomic theories (Note: including those of Adam Smith, Karl Marx, John Stuart Mill, John Maynard Keynes, Irving Fisher, and Milton Friedman) to explain stagflation was due to their focus on the nation as the salient unit of economic analysis, rather than the city. She proposed that the key to avoiding stagflation was for a nation to focus on the development of "import-replacing cities" that would experience economic ups and downs at different times, providing overall national stability and avoiding widespread stagflation. According to Jacobs, import-replacing cities are those with developed economies that balance their own production with domestic imports—so they can respond with flexibility as economic supply and demand cycles change. While lauding her originality, clarity, and consistency, urban planning scholars have criticised Jacobs for not comparing her own ideas to those of major theorists (e.g., Adam Smith, Karl Marx) with the same depth and breadth they developed, as well as a lack of scholarly documentation. Despite these issues, Jacobs' work is notable for having widespread public readership and influence on decision-makers.

== Responses ==
Stagflation undermined support for the Keynesian consensus.

Federal Reserve chairman Paul Volcker very sharply increased interest rates from 1979 to 1983 in what was called a "disinflationary scenario". After US prime interest rates had soared into the double-digits, inflation did come down; these interest rates were the highest long-term prime interest rates that had ever existed in modern capital markets. Volcker is often credited with having stopped at least the inflationary side of stagflation, although the American economy dipped into a recession with the unemployment rate peaking at 10.4% in February 1983. Economic recovery began in 1983. Both fiscal stimulus and money supply growth were policy at this time. A five- to six-year jump in unemployment during the Volcker disinflation suggests Volcker may have trusted unemployment to self-correct and return to its natural rate within a reasonable period.

== See also ==
- Biflation
- Chronic inflation
- Deflation
- Economic stagnation
- Hyperinflation
- Inflationism
- Shrinkflation
- Stagflation in the United States
- Zero interest-rate policy
- 1976 sterling crisis
- 2000s commodities boom
- 2020s commodities boom
