= Business failure =

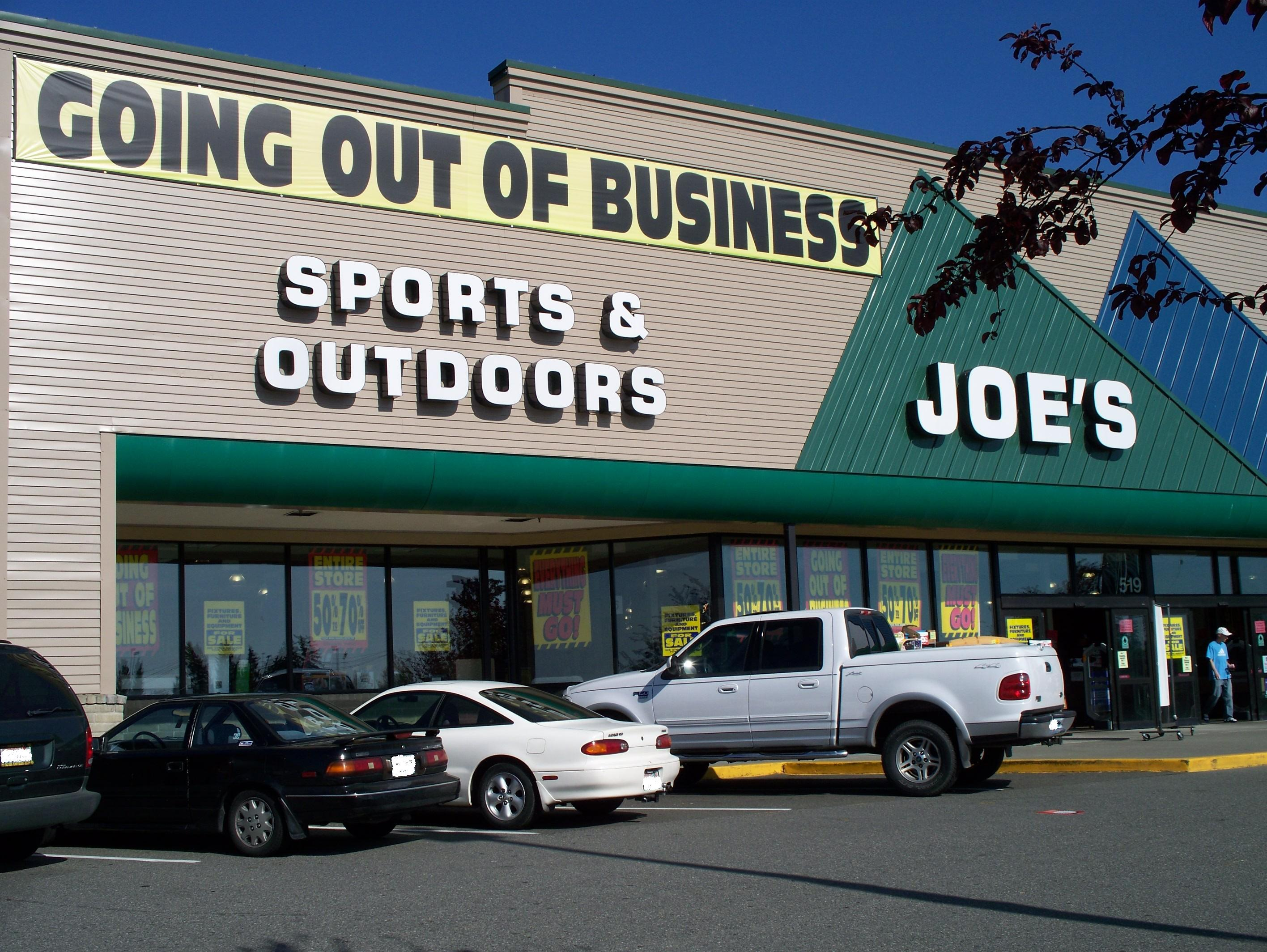
Joe's was a business which failed in 2009.

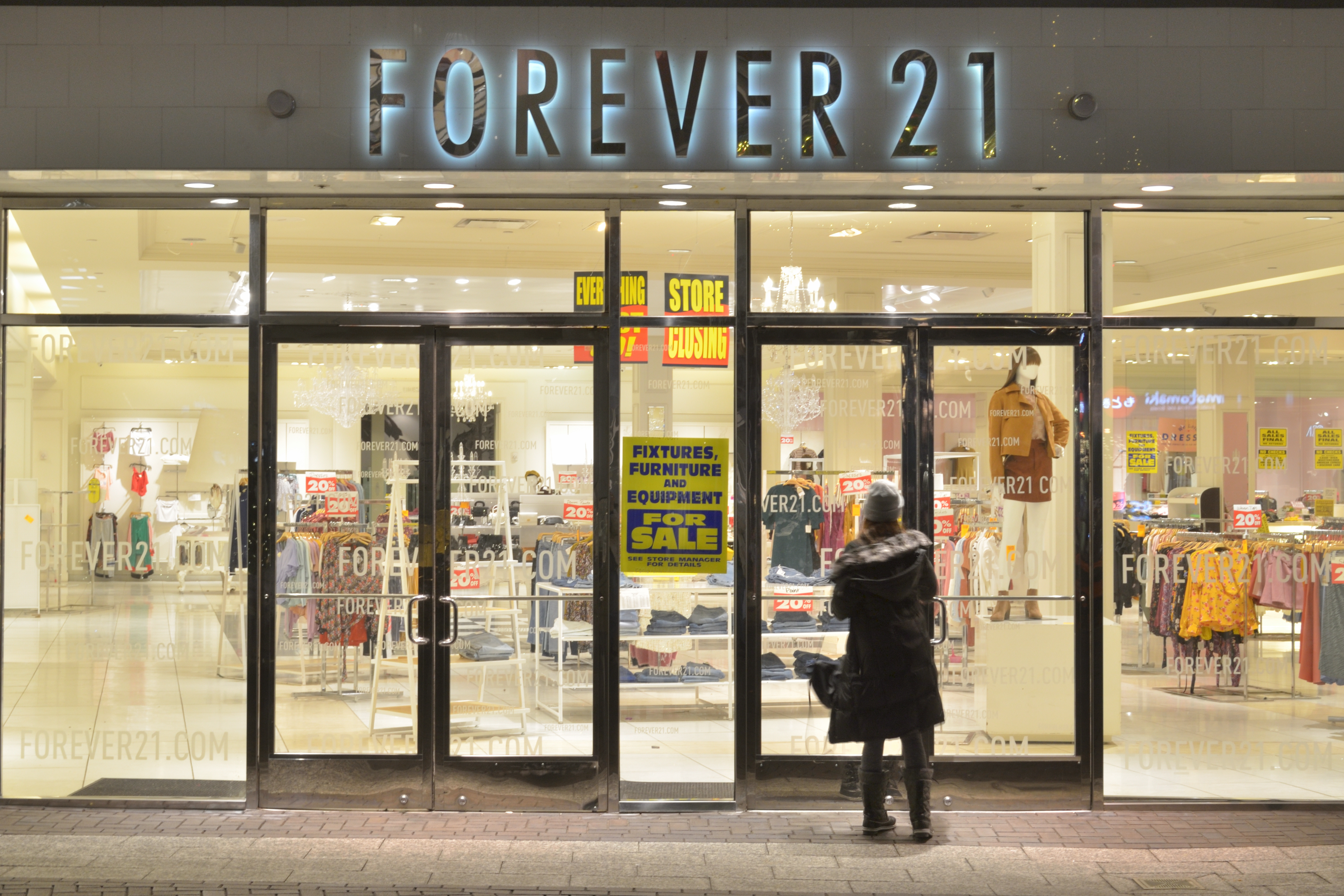
Liquidation sale occurring at a Forever 21 in Denver, Colorado in November 2019.

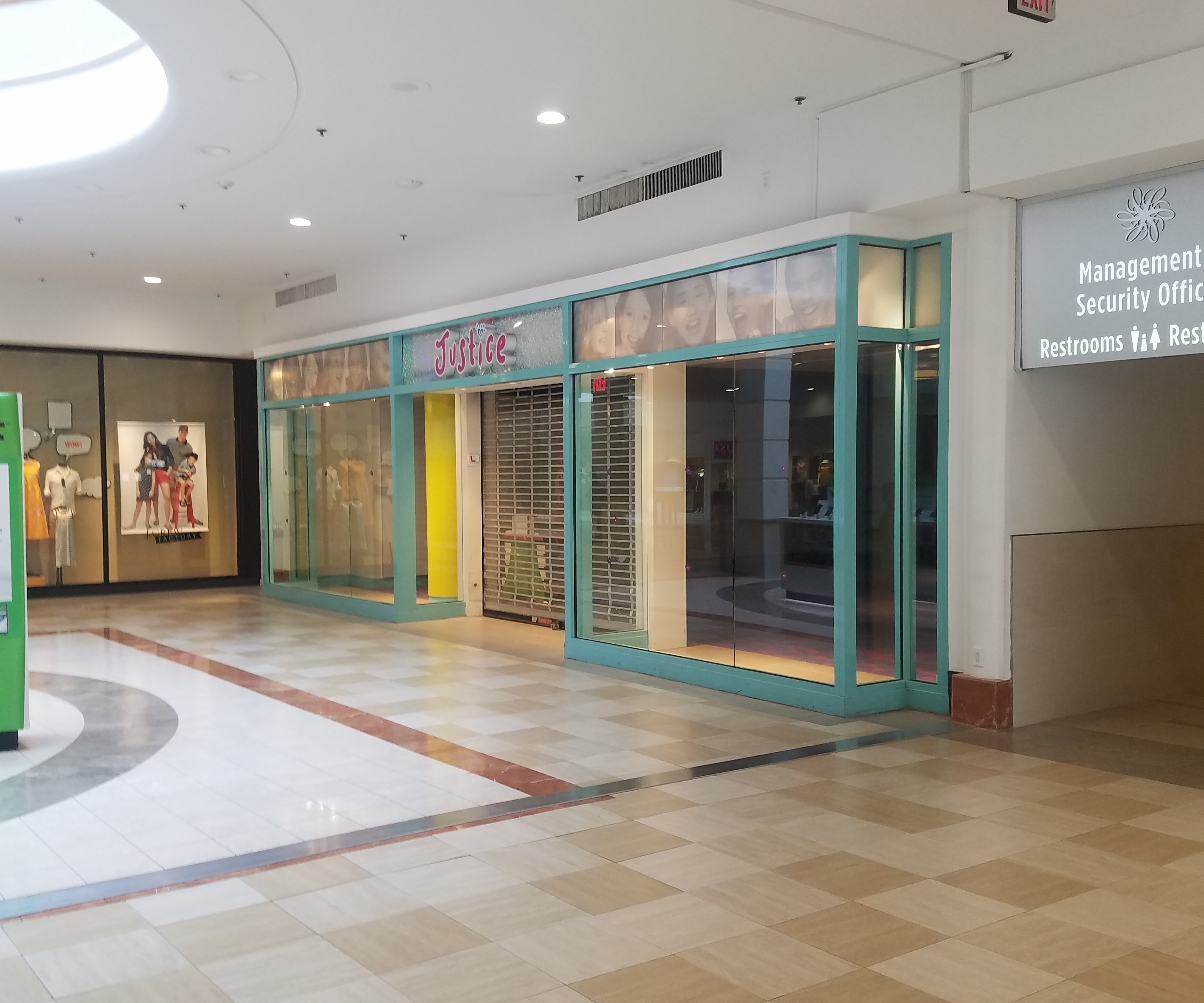
A closed Justice store at Colonie Center in Albany, New York in August 2020.

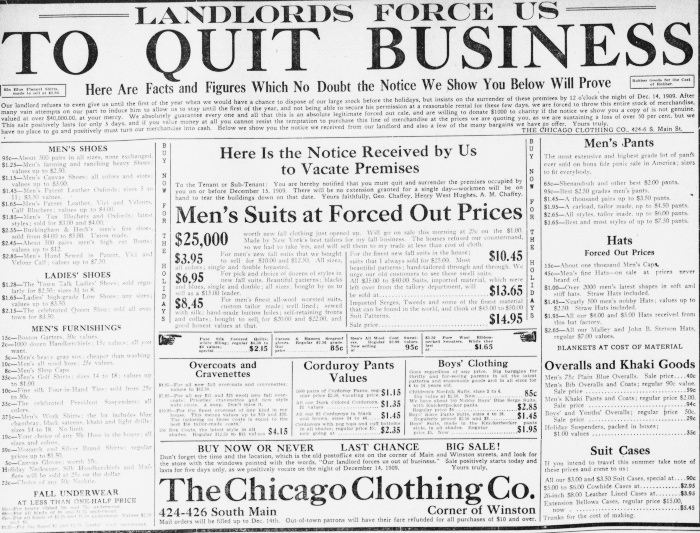
Advertisement for "Quitting Business" sale in Los Angeles, California, newspaper, 1909

Business failure refers to a company ceasing operations following its inability to make a profit or to bring in enough revenue to cover its expenses. A profitable business can fail if it does not generate adequate cash flow to meet expenses.

== Reasons ==
Businesses can fail as a result of wars, recessions, high taxation, high interest rates, excessive regulations, poor management decisions, insufficient marketing, inability to compete with other similar businesses, or a lack of interest from the public in the business's offerings. Some businesses may choose to shut down prior to an expected failure. Others may continue to operate until they are forced out by a court order.

The United States Small Business Administration, in an article on small business failure, lists additional reasons for failure from Michael Ames' book on "Small Business Management":

- lack of experience
- insufficient capital
- poor inventory management
- over-investment in fixed assets
- business's finance mismanagement
- poor business location
- poor credit arrangement management
- unexpected growth
- engaging in the wrong business niche
- inability to recover from a major business interruption

A study published in 2014 by the Turnaround Management Society assesses that most business crises are caused by the mistakes of upper management. The most frequent causes of a crisis are that the management continued with a strategy that was no longer working for the company (54.6%), and that they lost touch with the market and their customers and did not want to adapt to changes occurring around them (51.6%). Having a clear strategy that is communicated well to all operational areas, one that uses and builds USPs, is desirable for every company but is often not the case. Incorrect strategic decisions (39.4%) are often made because of the lack of a clear strategy, and they can have a significant impact on a company’s financial position in the market.

In its guidance to charities, the Charity Commission for England and Wales points out that a series of small events with a growing cumulative effect can be more likely to cause a business to fail than one major event.

There are many opinions about the most important reason that businesses fail:

- Management writer Peter Drucker claimed that the most important reason that businesses fail is because management didn't ask "what is our business?" in a "clear and sharp form".
- Eric T. Wagner, who has 30 years experience as a serial entrepreneur, says that entrepreneurs fail when developing new products because they "retreat to a cave" instead of thoroughly understanding their customers' needs.
- A survey of more than 1000 Australian SME business owners found that business failure was most likely because of an inability to manage costs.
- Dr. Christoph Lymbersky analysed internal causes over a timeline of 38 years which shows that the lack of financial control is becoming less and less relevant as a crisis factor. In 1984, inadequate financial control still contributed to 75 percent of all corporate crises. In his 2014 survey, only 36 percent or restructuring consultants reported inadequate financial control to be a cause of decline.
- According to a study by Industry Canada (now known as Innovation, Science and Economic Development Canada), "the main reason for (business) failure is inexperienced management. Managers of bankrupt firms do not have the experience, knowledge, or vision to run their businesses".
- M. Victor Janulaitis surveyed 278 organizations in 2018 on why disaster recovery and business continuity plans fail, and found that after 12 months 51% of small to mid-sized business were not able to re-open their doors.

== Events to occur after liquidation ==
After closing, a business may be dissolved and have its assets redistributed after filing articles of dissolution. A business that operates multiple locations may continue to operate, but close some of its locations that are under-performing, or in the case of a manufacturer, discontinue poorly selling products. Some struggling companies are acquired by new owners who may manage them more effectively, and some are merged with another company that will then take over its operations. Some businesses save themselves through bankruptcy or bankruptcy protection, thereby allowing themselves to restructure.

== Planning for business failure ==
The UK Government announced in 2018 that it was asking major suppliers to government to make plans for other organisations to step in the event of their business failing. Suppliers Capita, Serco and Sopra Steria had offered to pilot best practice in this field. David Lidington MP, who was then Cabinet Secretary, referred to learning from the events surrounding the collapse of Carillion, for which the government, as a customer, was not well prepared. He commented that when Carillion failed "it was left to government to step in - and it did. But we did not have the benefit of key organisational information that could have smoothed the management of the liquidation. By ensuring rapid contingency plans for rare supplier failures, we will be better prepared to maintain continuity of critical public services." The plans have been referred to as "living wills" - "a set of arrangements to facilitate the transfer of a contract back to Government or to another supplier if required".

== See also ==
Debt-related failures:

- Insolvency
  - Bankruptcy
- Liquidation
- Bank failure
  - Bank run
- Supply shock
- Demand shock
- Demand-pull inflation
- Cost-push inflation
