= Capital as Power =

Critique of neoclassical and Marxian economics

Capital as Power: A Study of Order and Creorder is a 2009 book on economics by Jonathan Nitzan and Shimshon Bichler. The authors introduce what they describe as a "non-Marxist" account of capitalist society. Larudee wrote:

The problem, these authors say, is that both Marxians and neoclassicals view capital as a purely economic concept, in that its value of capital is determined in production, yet they do not and cannot have any valid way of independently measuring the value of capital.

In an interview with Piotr Dutkiewicz, Bichler stated "[...] we argue that capitalism is best viewed not as a mode of production or consumption but as a mode of power." The summary of "capital as power" (CasP) as an economic outlook given in the Handbook of Alternative Theories of Political Economy is "capital as social power as represented in the monetary capitalisation of income-generating assets."

== Dualism of economics and politics ==
Capital as Power documents, among other things, the neoclassical economics project as a theoretical enterprise aiming to separate economics from politics. In earlier work dating from 2000, the authors had, under the heading of capital accumulation, traced that separation to the rise of industrial capitalism in the later 18th century. They identified with a theory of capital in the tradition of institutional economics.

== Creorder ==
The neologism "creorder", a portmanteau word made from "creation" and "order", was discussed in a 2013 review of Capital as Power by Alan Freeman:

Power creates, in each historical epoch a creorder (an amalgam of creation and order), whose organizing principle under capitalism is capitalization, the magnitudes assigned to streams of expected income [...] Power resides in the departure of capitalization from the social norm.

== Background in economics ==
Thorstein Veblen drew conclusions on capital from the emerging corporations of the Second Industrial Revolution and the economic power they gained, to the effect that they were "dominant actors" controlling "industrial knowledge" to build capital. This capitalization took place in a "community" and was conditioned by Knightian uncertainty. Chapter 12 of Capitalism as Power gives the authors' view of some historical background to their theory:

Perhaps the first attempt to develop a power theory of capital was offered at the turn of the century by Thorstein Veblen. Later, his student and colleague, Lewis Mumford, expanded some of Veblen's themes into a sweeping theory of power civilizations.

Evgeny Morozov wrote in 2022

There are, indeed, many interesting ways to deploy Veblen’s analytical framework—his distinction between efficiency-oriented industry and pecuniary-oriented business, for example—to argue that what really drives capitalists is not profit-seeking, but, rather, the ability to engage in sabotage, to ensure that today’'s robber barons receive not only the profits they expect, but higher profits than their competitors. In the past twenty years, a new approach to political economy known as Capital as Power (CasP), has emerged to do just that, introducing the concept of 'differential accumulation' to describe such dynamics.

In a footnote, Morozov references both the book Capital as Power and a critical review of it from a Marxist point of view by Bue Rübner Hansen.

According to the article devoted to "Capitalism as power" in the Handbook of Alternative Theories of Political Economy (2022), by Tim de Muzio and Matt Dow, the applicability of "absentee owner" to the capitalist derives from Veblen. In a 2012 review of Capitalism as Power, Salvador Santino Regilme commented that

This book offers a great service to the scholarship of political economy, most especially on its determined revival of the almost-forgotten 'Cambridge Controversy' on the ontological nature of capital [...] One of the most notable arguments advanced is the notion of capitalists as 'absentee owners of power' wherein there is a marked 'separation of ownership from production' [...]

A 2024 paper by Baines and Hager, referring to the book, comments that

[...] if one adopts the stringent empiricist view that any theorization of rent should enable us to delineate and measure precisely how much rent is being accrued, and that such measurements are best applied to the quantitative architecture of capital itself—corporate financial accounts—then the methodological issue becomes a conceptual problem

== Capitalization ==
As put by Kean Birch and Fabian Muniesa:

In their grand challenge to both neoclassical and Marxist economics, Nitzan and Bichler ... aim to rethink capitalism as a mode of accumulation based on capitalization.

David Troy Cochrane is an economist with the Canadian Labour Congress, whom Nitzan and Bichler credit with introducing the acronym CasP for "capital as power". Reviewing Capital as Power, Cochrane wrote in 2010:

Ostensibly, capitalization represents the present value of an asset: expected earnings discounted for the probability that the earnings will not be realized. If expected earnings increase, then the price of an asset increases. If the riskiness of the earnings increases, then the price decreases. Nitzan and Bichler assign much more meaning to this formula than merely its quotidian operation as they claim that it forms "the central institution and key logic" of capitalist society[...]

In a 2011 article Cochrane argued for a definition of capital as "quantified, vendible ownership claims over groupings of tangible and intangible assets that are expected to generate streams of earnings", as following from the ideas of Veblen and Cornelius Castoriadis. He took Nitan and Bichler's work to indicate the conception of capital accumulation as "the process that involves an exercise of control within social institutions so as to expand ownership claims and increase the expected earnings of existing claims".

Cochrane wrote a 2015 doctoral dissertation at York University, Toronto as a student of Nitzan, under the title What's Love Got to Do with It? Diamonds and the Accumulation of De Beers, 1935-55, examining the diamond cartel De Beers in a world perspective. In a 2020 paper on the Deepwater Horizon oil spill, he discussed the reputational damage suffered by BP from the CasP point of view, in terms of a formulation "confidence in obedience" of power.

== Power theory of value ==
Nitzan and Bichler take it that power, in a capitalist epoch, is rooted in private ownership; and private ownership is an act of institutionalized exclusion, and so a matter of organized power. This analysis has been cited in relation with the 1982 conceptual art installation Wheatfield by Agnes Denes, in Manhattan's Battery Park area.

A capitalist strives to accumulate greater earnings than competitors: Nitzan and Bichler label this process differential accumulation. A power theory of value applies when differential accumulation means that some owners' growth of capitalization is at a faster rate than the average pace. As Nitzan and Bichler explain in a later work, "modern capitalists" work in a framework where a "normal rate of return" serves as a benchmark: the aim is to exceed it. Not, therefore, profit maximization, a concept they claim is unclear. The CasP view gives attention to firms, as institutions, as they "exert power over a broad social field to generate revenue".

The Handbook article finds the CasP approach has some affinity with the ideas of Michał Kalecki and the neo-Marxian "monopoly school". In a book chapter "The power of investment banks: surplus absorption or differential capitalization?" from 2013, Hager defended the worth of the CasP approach, against the description from industrial economics held to be central by the "monopoly school", that cornering the market was the aim. He cited the volatility in returns from investment banking.

== Contents ==
The book is in five parts:

Part I

Why write a book about capital?

Part II

Dilemmas of political economy

Part III

Capitalization

Part IV

Bringing power back in

Part V

Accumulation of power

Regilme wrote:

Part 1 discusses extensively that the erroneous economistic understanding of capital can be found in the problematic bifurcation between politics and economics, and within economics itself, the infamous and convoluted distinction between nominal and real. Part 2, meanwhile, concentrates on the misguided conceptions of capital from both the Marxist and liberal viewpoints. [...] Part 3 further explores the faultiness of capital conceived within the theoretical purviews of production and equipment, instead of the intricate subtleties of capitalisation and finance. Conclusively, Part 4 introduces a heterodox theory of capital accumulation, and Part 5 justifies the authors' concept of capital as power.
