= Biflation =

Economic process

Biflation (sometimes mixflation, indeflation, or compartflation) is a state of the economy, in which the processes of inflation and deflation occur simultaneously in different parts of the economy. The term was coined in 2003 by F. Osborne Brown, a senior financial analyst at Phoenix Investment Group, and has later been widely used in the media. During the biflation, there is a simultaneous rise in prices (inflation) for commodities bought out of the basic income (earnings), and a parallel fall in prices (deflation) for goods bought mainly on credit. Biflation may be seen in the CPI composition: some CPI components are in the inflationary territory, while others are facing deflationary pressure. As such, biflation reflects the complexity of the modern financial system.

== Overview ==
Biflation is a type of Cantillon effect occurring when monetary authorities apply the expansionary monetary policy in an attempt to alleviate a recession. Biflation is an unusual, yet temporary, situation taking place in a fragile economy. On the one hand, with biflation due to the massive emission of money by central banks, the money supply increases. This leads to an increase in prices for the most essential goods (food, energy, clothing), since the total demand for these goods is relatively stable.

On the other hand, a depressed economy leads to an increase in unemployment and a decrease in the purchasing power of the population. Therefore, people usually buy the most essential goods, and the demand for long-term assets purchased on loans (houses, cars, capital equipment, and other typically debt-based items) is falling. Also falls demand for unnecessary goods, such as collectibles (coins, post stamps, etc.) As a result, their prices also fall.

The presence of biflation in the economy leads to a distortion in the estimate of inflation. For example, rising prices for everyday goods are offset by falling prices for homes and cars. As a result, the official inflation rate does not reflect the real rise in the cost of living for the low-income population. Biflation can also be observed in a separate industry. For example, in the real estate market during the economic downturn, prices for economy-class housing often rise, while prices for elite housing decline.

== Key features ==
- Biflation is usually a sign of the weak economy because there is a demand for basic goods only as people are afraid to raise loans to finance long-term assets. However, this feature is sometimes disputable.
- Biflation is felt differently among various social strata; usually, low-income people suffer the most. This fact increases the wealth gap and may ultimately lead to a major civil unrest.
- It may be felt both in the whole economy and in some sectors.
- Biflation leads to a distortion in the estimate of true inflation, creating additional problems for businesses, banks, investment funds, and monetary authorities. For example, it gets harder to calculate wages adjustments and cost of capital.
- As economy recovers, inflation and deflation forces broadly cancel each other out, but uncertainty in everyday activities may be prolonged.
- Biflation and stagflation can occur at the same time as their definitions partly overlap.

== Reasons ==
Among the reasons causing this unusual phenomenon are:

- Quantitative easing creates excessive money supply that distorts the balance within the economy, leading to prices rising in some sectors of the economy while falling in others.
- Economic globalisation may lead to both inflation and deflation being imported from other countries. For example, rapidly developing Asian countries were blamed for the increase in prices for commodities; the effect of which was felt globally.

== See also ==
- Chronic inflation
- Debt deflation
- Economic stagnation
- Inflationism
- Liquidity trap
- Monetary inflation
- Shrinkflation
- Zero interest-rate policy
