= Chronic inflation =

Economic accrual of large inflation for many years

Chronic inflation is an economic phenomenon occurring when a country experiences high inflation for a prolonged period (several years or decades) due to continual increases in the money supply among other things. In countries with chronic inflation, inflation expectations become 'built-in', and it becomes extremely difficult to reduce the inflation rate because the process of reducing inflation by, for example, slowing down the growth rate of the money supply, will often lead to high unemployment until inflationary expectations have adjusted to the new situation.

Chronic inflation is distinct from hyperinflation.

== Occurrence ==
Even more so than hyperinflation, chronic inflation is a 20th-century phenomenon, being first observed by Felipe Pazos in 1972. High inflation can only be sustained with unbacked paper currencies over long periods, and before World War II unbacked paper currencies were rare except in countries affected by war – which often produced extremely high inflation but never for more than a few years. Most economists believe chronic inflation first emerged in Latin America following World War II, with the result that it was originally called "Latin inflation". Some economists, however, argue that the experience of France in the 1920s was the first case of chronic inflation. Japan (see below) in the years surrounding World War II is another case with characteristics very akin to well-studied cases of chronic inflation.

== Causes ==
Monetarists state that chronic inflation is caused by chronic growth of the money supply, a position that is accepted by most mainstream economists. This paragraph describes reasons for persistent monetary growth.

In the 1960s and 1970s, chronic inflation was attributed to powerful political group interests with radically divergent policy demands; the power of labour unions to demand high wages for workers, often in obsolete economic sectors, conflicted with the somewhat feudal political structures of the affected countries. Under these conditions, a return to a commodity money that would curb inflation quickly is politically suicidal, so governments of countries affected by chronic inflation have invariably had to resort to more subtle methods of reducing inflation, such as central bank reforms or indexing price and wage levels to the future value of money. This, however, leads to "inflation inertia" and ultimately to a public that becomes skeptical of attempts to reduce inflation: unlike hyperinflation, history has shown that communities can live with moderate chronic inflation relatively easily.

Other sources have argued that chronic inflation is caused by governments seeking to optimize seignorage taxes in order to pay most efficiently for public programmes, or because the societies in which it developed have consistently imported more than they can export and their currencies have had to devalue constantly to make their imports more expensive without elasticity being sufficient to reduce demand. Along the same lines, there have also been arguments for demographic causes of chronic inflation as resulting from populations growing more rapidly than production in developing nations from the 1950s to the 1980s, and until today in sub-Saharan Africa. Increasingly it is also thought that environmental or ecological stresses and disasters can trigger a period of systemic inflation by governments unable to effectively handle the situation.

== Examples ==
=== Argentina ===
The Argentine economy has a long history of experiencing trouble with prolonged high inflation rates. In 1989, Argentina experienced a hyperinflation crisis as a result of bad economic policies, which led to an inflation rate of 257%. The hyperinflation crisis caused protests, riots, looting and a general decline of the government popularity among the public. This hyperinflation crisis had also taken place in the middle of the presidential elections, which led to the governing party to lose the elections.

During the 1990s, thanks to the convertibility plan, which pegged the austral (and, afterward, the peso) to the United States Dollar value, inflation rates decreased nearly to 0%. These policies ended with a catastrophic economic crisis in 2001.

During the 21st century, Argentina didn't experience real inflationary troubles until 2007, which saw a rise in inflation rates. During Cristina Kirchner's government, inflation rates were at an all-time high, with the highest inflation rates experienced in 2013, which saw a rise of the inflation rate to 30% to 40%.

This was compensated, albeit partly, with high purchasing power and subsidization, the latter increasing the fiscal deficit.

In December 2015, Mauricio Macri assumed the presidency of the nation, with a 40% inflation from Cristina Kirchner's presidency. When 2016 ended, inflation was in a recent of 42%.

The Argentine Ministry of Economy had put in action a project that claimed to reduce inflation from 40% to 20% (+/- 2%) in 2017, to 10% (+/- 2%) in 2018 and to 5% (+/- 1%) in 2019. The project initially led to 24% inflation in 2017, but it did not work in 2018, with an inflation rate of 47.6%, and in 2019, inflation was 53%.

=== Bulgaria ===
In 1996, the Bulgarian economy collapsed due to the slow and mismanaged economic reforms of several governments in a row, shortages of wheat, and an unstable and decentralized banking system, which led to an inflation rate of 311% and the collapse of the lev, with the exchange rate to dollars reaching 3000. When pro-reform forces came into power in the spring 1997, an ambitious economic reform package, including introduction of a currency board regime and pegging the Bulgarian Lev to the German Deutsche Mark (and subsequently to the euro), was agreed to with the International Monetary Fund and the World Bank, and the economy began to stabilize.

=== Chile ===
Chile had prolonged inflation for the greater part of the twentieth century. Inflation first became persistent at the tail end of the 1930s as the government began a process of import substitution, rising steady to 84 percent in 1955. After slowing in the late 1950s, inflation rose again under Allende and peaked anywhere between 500% and 1,000% in late 1973 (which some consider hyperinflation, though the monthly inflation rate reached 30% for a single month). A 1973 coup d'état deposed Allende and installed a military government led by Augusto Pinochet. Pinochet's free-market economic policy gradually ended chronic inflation, which stabilised in single figures for the first time in forty-five years. Overall impact of chronic inflation: 1 current peso = 1,000,000 pre-1960 pesos.

=== Guinea ===
Guinea has seen year on year inflation rates hover well above 50% since the late 1990s, though many months have seen much lower levels in the single digits. In Guinea the normal drivers of inflation are food supply and distribution, and global commodity prices. Political instability has also contributed greatly to the fall in the Guinean franc's value in recent years due to a series of coups following the ouster of longtime military strongman Lansana Conté and mass protests. Some government mitigation policies and economic growth have progressively stabilized inflation rates which reached their peak in July 2005 at 42.6% for the month to a current average of 9.7% per month. On 21 July 2010, Yahoo! Finance quoted the rate as 5,050 GNF to 1 USD. As of 17 January 2020, the exchange rate was 7,023 GNF to 1 USD.

=== Israel ===
Inflation accelerated in the 1970s, rising steadily from 13% in 1971 to 111% in 1979. From 133% in 1980, it leaped to 191% in 1983 and then to 445% in 1984, threatening to become a four-digit figure within a year or two. In 1985 Israel froze most prices by law and enacted other measures as part of an economic stabilization plan. That same year, inflation more than halved, to 185%. Within a few months, the authorities began to lift the price freeze on some items; in other cases it took almost a year. By 1986, inflation was down to 19%.

=== Iraq ===
Years of constant war and rebuilding resulted in large amounts of government spending, with international sanctions creating shortages and limits on borrowing. Between 1987 and 1995 the Iraqi Dinar went from an official value of 0.306 Dinars/USD (or US$3.26 per dinar; the black market rate is thought to have been substantially fewer dinars per dollar) to 3000 Dinars/USD due to government loss of their Swiss printing press and the printing of inferior quality notes. This equates to approximately 315% inflation per year averaged over that eight-year period.

=== Japan ===
As Hirohito prepared for war to gain access to rubber and mineral resources, Japan began experiencing steady inflation from 1934. By the end of 1949, retail prices were more than 150 times their level in 1939, and the highest denomination was a 75,000,000,000 Yen bank cheque. The Japan wholesale price index (relative to 1 as the average of 1930) shot up to 16.3 in 1943, 127.9 in 1948 and 342.5 in 1951. In the early 1950s, after the end of US military occupation, Japan controlled its own money. Through its rapidly growing export trade, Japan stabilized the yen quickly.

=== Laos ===
Starting in the late 1980s financial aid and trade with the USSR greatly decreased, which began a two-decade long period of high inflation that began to accelerate by 1996 with the East Asian financial crisis which had severely impacted Laos, burdened with large amounts of foreign debt coupled with very slow growth. By January 1998 inflation had reached 100% a month and did not dip below that level again until late 1999, after it had peaked well above 167%. For a short time the Lao kip gained the less than respected title of being "least valued currency unit." Although the kip has officially returned to lower inflation levels the local inflation rates remain much higher, spurred on by rising food and import prices. The emergence of a new debt crisis in 2013 has brought more uncertainty.

=== Madagascar ===
The Malagasy franc (iraimbilanja) had a turbulent time in 2004, losing nearly half its value and sparking rampant inflation. On 1 January 2005, the ariary, worth five francs, became the main currency unit in Madagascar. In May 2005, there were riots over rising inflation. Disinflation calmed the situation from 2005 to 2008, but riots ensued in 2009 as prices continued to rise.

=== Mexico ===
In spite of the oil crisis of the late 1970s (Mexico is a producer and exporter), and due to excessive social spending, Mexico defaulted on its external debt in 1982. As a result, the country suffered a severe case of capital flight and over a decade of chronic inflation and peso devaluation. In 1984, the highest denomination was 10,000 pesos , by 1991 it was 100,000 pesos and many Mexicans took to putting their savings into dollars. On 1 January 1993, Mexico created a new currency, the nuevo peso ("new peso", or MXN), which chopped 3 zeros off the old peso, an inflation rate of 10,000% over the decade of the crisis. (One new peso was equal to 1000 of the obsolete MXP pesos). The actual highest denomination was 1,000 pesos, worth 1,000,000 old pesos.

=== Mozambique ===
Mozambique was one of the world's poorest and most underdeveloped countries when it became independent of Portugal in 1975, the last colonial power to relinquish its African territories. A brutal civil war between the communist government and rebel forces from 1977 to 1992 led to continuous inflation. The highest denomination in 1976 was 100 meticais. By 2004, it was 500,000 meticais. In the 2006 currency reform, 1 new metical was exchanged for 1,000 old meticais.

=== North Korea ===
Though the North Korean Won, officially called the Korean People's won (KPW) never technically failed it had been steadily devalued since 2002 when the dollar peg was removed. During a 2009 revaluation, the government gave citizens seven days to turn in their old won for new won — with 1,000 old worth 10 of the new — but allowed a maximum exchange of only 150,000 of the old won. That meant each adult could legally exchange about US$740-worth of won. The exchange cap wiped out the savings of many North Koreans, and reportedly caused unrest in parts of the country. Many of the exchange and time limits for conversion were either dropped or extended after prices soared over 1000% in some regions in the first week as people rushed to buy as much things as they could. According to a September 2009 BBC report, some department stores in Pyongyang even stopped accepting North Korean won, instead insisting upon payment in U.S. dollars, Chinese renminbi, euros, or even Japanese yen.

=== Syria ===
The Syrian Civil War has resulted in a substantial capital fight of Syrian goods and services to nearby Arab countries. Before the war, the exchange rate was remarkably stable; one U.S. dollar was quoted at 47 Syrian pounds. As of 19 January 2020, profound effects of the Syrian Civil War to the Syrian economy reduced the value of the Syrian pound to less than one thousandth of a U.S. dollar in the black market, representing a devaluation of 96% since the start of the war. Between 1 January and 16 January 2020, the Syrian pound lost a quarter of its value relative to the U.S. dollar, from 900 SYP/USD to 1200 SYP/USD.

Further compounding the problem, the use of currencies other than Syrian pounds in any transaction is forbidden under Syrian law, and on 18 January 2020, Syrian president Bashar al-Assad increased the penalty for unauthorised use of foreign currency anywhere in Syria to seven years of hard labour. Despite the law, Syrians continue to resort to hard currencies such as U.S. dollars or euros to maintain their purchasing power.

=== Turkey ===
Throughout the 1990s Turkey dealt with severe inflation rates that finally crippled the economy into a recession in 2001. The highest denomination in 1995 was 1,000,000 lira. By 2005 it was 20,000,000 lira. Recently Turkey has achieved single digit inflation for the first time in decades, and in the 2005 currency reform, introduced the New Turkish Lira; 1 was exchanged for 1,000,000 old lira.

=== Uzbekistan ===
Uzbekistan has perpetually experienced high inflation since the time of independence. In 1994 the highest denomination available was 100 som, the current highest is 5000 som with a face value of roughly $2.00 as of 2014 and large bundles of currency are required for any substantial purchase, with most prices rounded off to the nearest thousand.

=== Venezuela ===
Venezuela has a legacy of multiple inflation crises linked to mismanagement and lack of economic diversification. The largest and longest period was in the 1980s and 1990s; inflation peaked in 1996, increasing from 60% in January to an all-time high of 118.8% in July of that same year. Revenue from petroleum exports accounts for more than 50% of the country's GDP and roughly 95% of total exports, and after decades of some of the strongest economic growth in South America the trend went into sharp reversal as oil prices began their steady drop following the end of the 1970s oil crisis, from which both OPEC member and non-member producers had benefited greatly. This period of economic contraction in Venezuela coincided with the beginning of the 1980s oil glut, which saw large cutbacks in production and state revenue. Since the early 2000s the administration of Hugo Chavez responded to the ongoing crisis with a series of often flawed price controls, state acquisition and reappropriation of both public and private assets and funds, and a revaluation of the bolivar in 2008 which slashed three zeroes off the currency. However, changes in economic reliance on petroleum and mining exports were never made, and Venezuela remained vulnerable to global supply of and demand for oil, and continued to suffer systemic economic problems and a return to high inflation. As of January 2014, Venezuela had the highest inflation rate in the world at 56.2% (63.4% in August 2014), though official numbers are stated to be much lower. The national economy has contracted for three consecutive quarters, officially putting the country in recession, while a global crash in oil prices crimp revenue and contribute to fears of a potential default which could bring inflation levels even higher.

=== Zambia ===
Falling copper prices, the oil crisis, and failed economic management in the 1970s led to shortfalls and severe economic crisis in Zambia by the early 80s, instigating a nationwide famine and forcing the government to borrow massive amounts of money and commit to extreme IMF economic reforms which led to anti-government riots and the devaluation of the kwacha. Inflation held around 15% in the 1980s until hitting 54% in 1988, to 191% in 1992, and 183% in 1993, compounded further by a prolonged drought. A "cash-budgeting system" and free market reforms brought inflation down to 55% in 1994, and 25% in 1998.

== See also ==
- Hyperinflation
- Hyperstagflation
- Disinflation
- Inflationism
- Spanish Price Revolution (c. 1450–c. 1650)
- Stagflation
