= Triangle model =

Model of economic inflation

In macroeconomics, the triangle model employed by new Keynesian economics is a model of inflation derived from the Phillips Curve and given its name by Robert J. Gordon. The model views inflation as having three root causes: built-in inflation, demand-pull inflation, and cost-push inflation. Unlike the earliest theories of the Phillips Curve, the triangle model attempts to account for the phenomenon of stagflation.

== See also ==
- Inflation § New_Keynesians
- Phillips curve § Gordon's triangle model
- Wage-price spiral
