= Demand-pull theory =

Economic theory

In economics, the demand-pull theory is the theory that inflation occurs when demand for goods and services exceeds existing supplies. According to the demand pull theory, there is a range of effects on innovative activity driven by changes in expected demand, the competitive structure of markets, and factors which affect the valuation of new products or the ability of firms to realize economic benefits.

== See also ==
- Demand-pull inflation
- Quantity theory of money
- Cost-push theory
