= Inertial inflation =

Inertial inflation is a situation in which all prices in an economy are continuously adjusted with relation to a price index by force of contracts.

Changes in price indices trigger changes in prices of goods. Contracts are made to accommodate the price-changing scenario by means of indexation. Indexation in a high-inflation economy is evident when, for instance, a given price must be recalculated later to incorporate inflation accumulated over the period to "correct" the price. In other cases, local currency prices can be expressed in terms of a foreign currency. At some point in the future, prices are converted back from the foreign currency equivalent into local currency. The conversion from a "stronger" currency equivalent value, the foreign currency, is intended to protect the real value of goods, as the nominal value depreciates.

In the medium and long terms, economic agents begin to forecast inflation and to use those forecasts as de facto price indexes that can trigger price adjustments before the actual price indices are made known to the public. That cycle of forecast-price adjustment-forecast closes itself in the form of a feedback loop, and inflation indices get beyond control since current inflation becomes the basis for future inflation (more formally, economic agents start to adjust prices solely based on their expectations of future inflation). At worst, inflation tends to grow exponentially and leads to hyperinflation.

== Built-in inflation ==
Built-in inflation is a type of inflation that results from past events and persists in the present.

Built-in inflation is one of three major determinants of the current inflation rate. In Robert J. Gordon's triangle model of inflation, the current inflation rate equals the sum of demand-pull inflation, cost-push inflation, and built-in inflation. "Demand-pull inflation" refers to the effects of falling unemployment rates (rising real gross domestic product) in the Phillips curve model, while the other two factors lead to shifts in the Phillips curve.

The built-in inflation originates from either persistent demand-pull or large cost-push (supply-shock) inflation in the past. It then becomes a "normal" aspect of the economy, via inflationary expectations and the price/wage spiral.

- Inflationary expectations play a role because if workers and employers expect inflation to persist in the future, they will increase their (nominal) wages and prices now. (See real vs. nominal in economics.) This means that inflation happens now simply because of subjective views about what may happen in the future. Following the generally accepted theory of adaptive expectations, such inflationary expectations arise because of persistent past experience with inflation.
- The price/wage spiral is the adversarial nature of bargaining about wages in modern capitalism. It is part of the conflict theory of inflation. Workers and employers usually do not get together to agree on the value of real wages. Instead, workers attempt to protect their real wages from falling in response to inflation (or to attain a target real wage) by pushing for higher money (nominal) wages. Thus, if they expect price inflation – or have experienced price inflation in the past – they push for higher nominal wages. If they are successful, this raises the costs faced by their employers. To protect the real value of their profits (or to attain a target profit rate or rate of return on investment), employers then pass the higher costs on to consumers in the form of higher prices. This encourages workers to push for higher nominal wages because these price rises raise their cost of living; so the inflationary cycle reinforces itself.

In the end, built-in inflation involves a vicious circle of both subjective and objective elements, so that inflation encourages inflation to persist. It means that the standard methods of fighting inflation using monetary policy or fiscal policy to induce a recession are extremely expensive, i.e. they can cause large rises in unemployment and large falls in real gross domestic product. This suggests that alternative methods such as wage and price controls (incomes policies) may also be needed in the fight against inflation.

== See also ==
- 1972 Chile is an example of another positive feedback mechanism in inflation, through the fiscal deficit/black economy channel
- Hyperinflation has an overview of uncontrollable inflation causes.
