= Wage–price spiral =

Economic concept

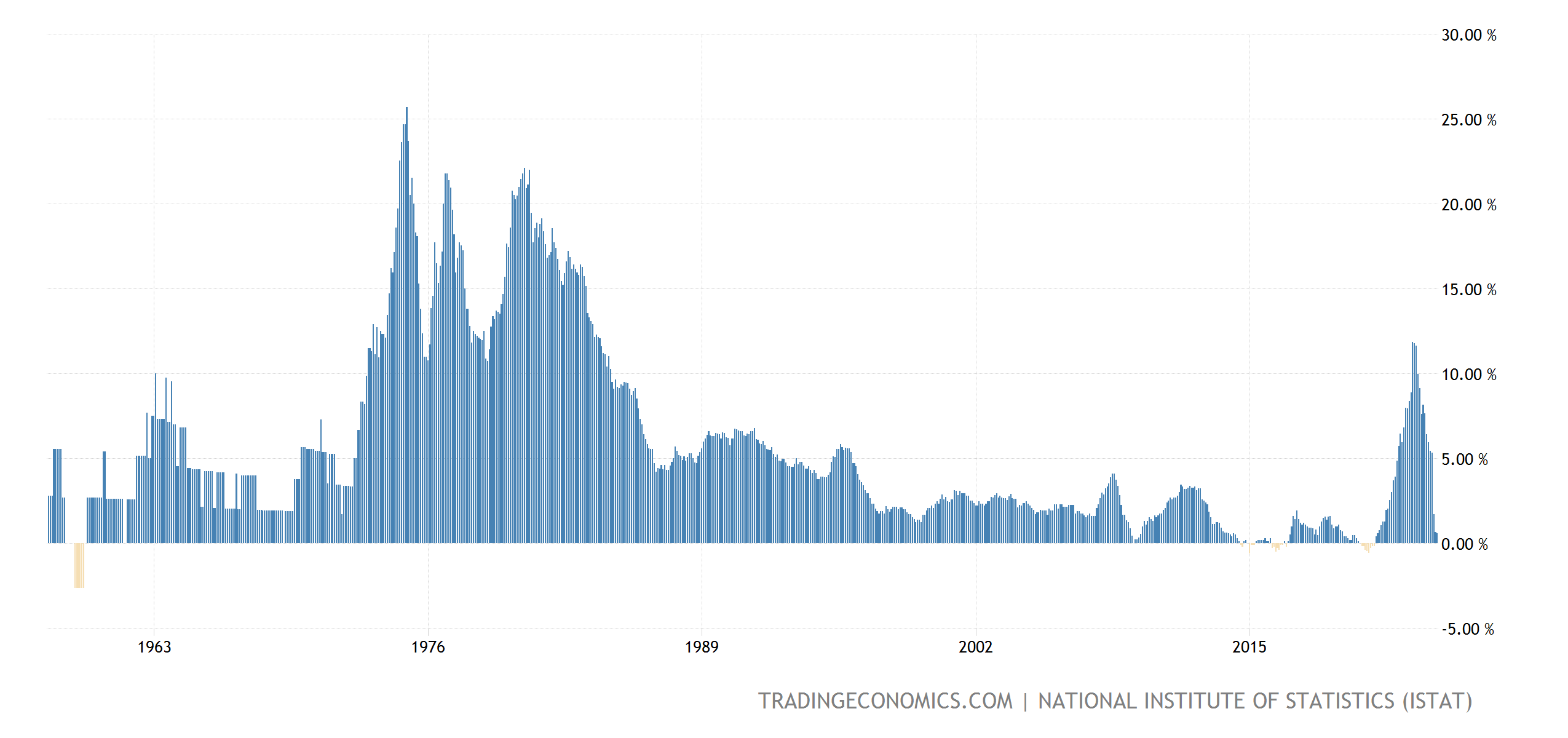
Trend of monthly inflation rate in Italy, from 1962 to February 2022.

In macroeconomics, a wage–price spiral (or, conversely, a price–wage spiral) is an explanation for inflation, in which wage increases cause price increases, which in turn cause wage increases, in a positive feedback loop. Greg Mankiw writes, "At some point, this spiral of ever-rising wages and prices will slow... In the long run, the economy returns to [the point] where the aggregate-demand curve crosses the long-run aggregate-supply curve."

== History ==
An early use of the concept was in 1868. The term "wage–price spiral" appeared in a 1937 New York Times article about the Little Steel strike. In the 1970s, US President Richard Nixon attempted to break what he saw as a "spiral" of prices and costs, by imposing a price freeze, with little effect.

Some sources distinguish between wage–price spirals and price–wage spirals.

Olivier Blanchard argues that the concept declined with the rise of rational expectations theory. Blanchard attempts to rehabilitate the concept, whilst according to Daniel J.B. Mitchell and Christopher L. Erickson its fall in popularity instead coincided with the decline of unions and collective bargaining. They write, "With the rapid pace of union membership decline in the early 1980s, followed by erosion relative to the overall workforce thereafter, it became progressively difficult to tie inflation to unions, and thus to worker demands".

== Criticism ==
The Socialist Worker argues that it is a myth used to prevent wage increases. Tribune magazine also sees the concept as rhetoric intended to hold down worker wages.

Milton Friedman criticised the concept of wage–price spirals, arguing "It's the external manifestation of inflation, but not its source... the inflation arises from one and only one reason: an increase in a quantity of money." In his view, wage–price spirals will break naturally if the quantity of money is not increased, albeit in the meanwhile "there will for a time be a continuation of inflation" as well as "some measure of recession and unemployment". Studies undertaken by the International Monetary Fund have found that even short-term spirals rarely led to a "sustained" increase in wage and price levels.

== See also ==
- Cost-push inflation
- Demand-pull inflation
- Built-in inflation
- Triangle model
- Inflationary spike
