= 1985 Israel Economic Stabilization Plan =

Neoliberal reforms under the Peres premiership

The Economic Stabilization Plan was implemented in Israel in 1985 in response to the dire domestic economic situation of the early 1980s.

== History ==
The years after the 1973 Yom Kippur War were a lost decade economically, as growth stalled, inflation soared and government expenditures rose significantly. Then, in 1983, Israel suffered what was known as the "bank stock crisis". By 1984 inflation was reaching an annual rate close to 450% and projected to reach over 1000% by the end of the following year. The economic crisis created feelings of anxiety, confusion, and lack of trust in the government among the Israeli citizens. See Economy of Israel § History.

In response, on July 1, 1985, the government of Shimon Peres implemented an economic stabilization plan aimed at generating "sharp disinflation". The plan was devised by Yitzhak Moda'i and Michael Bruno. This was done after a series of smaller, so-called "package deals" that were negotiated with selected entities in the Israeli economy proved ineffective in stemming the rise of inflation. It was not until the implementation of this wider-scale stabilization plan, which brought together all the main players in the Israeli economy at the time (the government, labor unions, and the central bank) that inflation was successfully brought to under 20% in less than two years. Some of its main points included:

- A significant cut in government expenditures and deficit.
- Reaching an agreement with the then-powerful Histadrut labor union to enact wage controls, thus decoupling rampant wage from price inflation.
- Emergency measures imposing temporary price controls over a broad range of basic products and services.
- A sharp devaluation of the Shekel, followed by a policy of a long-term fixed foreign exchange rate.
- Curbing the Bank of Israel's ability to print money to cover government deficits.

These steps, coupled with the subsequent introduction of market-oriented structural reforms, including the privatization of many government-owned businesses, successfully reinvigorated the economy and paved the way for its rapid growth in the 1990s. The plan has since become a model for other countries facing similar economic crises.

== See also ==
- Economy of Israel
- Banking in Israel
