= Reflation =

Term in economics

Reflation is used to describe a return of prices to a previous rate of inflation. One usage describes an act of stimulating the economy by increasing the money supply or by reducing taxes, seeking to bring the economy (specifically the price level) back up to the long-term trend, following a dip in the business cycle. It is the opposite of disinflation, which seeks to return the economy back down to the long-term trend.

== Overview ==
In this perspective, reflation, is contrasted with inflation (narrowly speaking) above the some long-term trend line, while reflation is a recovery of the price level when it has fallen below the trend line. For example, if inflation had been running at a 3% rate, but for one year it falls to 0%, the following year would need 6% inflation (actually 6.09% due to compounding) to catch back up to the long-term trend. This higher than normal inflation is considered reflation, since it is a return to trend, not exceeding the long-term trend.

This distinction is predicated on a theory that economic growth, where there is long-term growth in the economy and price level, is both sustainable and desirable. Just as disinflation is considered an acceptable antidote to high inflation, reflation is considered to be an antidote to deflation (which, unlike inflation, is considered bad regardless of its magnitude).

Reflation has also found usage in forensic economics to describe a return to monopolistic (exorbitant) price paths following correction. Inflation can be regarded as expansion of prices beyond previous levels, while reflation can describe return to a previous pricing strategy.

== Policy ==
The term "reflation" can also refer to an economic policy whereby a government uses fiscal or monetary stimulus in order to expand a country's output. This can possibly be achieved by methods that include reducing tax, changing the money supply, or even adjusting interest rates.

Originally, it was used to describe a recovery of price to a previous desirable level after a fall caused by a recession. Today it also (in addition to the above) describes the first phase in the recovery of an economy which is beginning to experience increasing prices at the end of a slump. With rising prices, employment, output and income also increase till the economy reaches the level of full employment.

== See also ==
- Economic bubble
- Inflationism
