= Salvador Santino Regilme =

Filipino scholar and political scientist

- Citizenship: Dutch (Netherlands)
- Occupations: Associate Professor, MA in International Relations Program

Academic background
- Education: Freie Universität Berlin, PhD Yale University Universität Osnabrück
- Doctoral advisor: Lora Anne Viola
- Other advisors: Thomas Risse, Susan D. Hyde

Academic work
- Discipline: Political Science and North American Studies
- Sub-discipline: International Relations
- Institutions: Leiden University
- Website: http://santinoregilme.weebly.com/

Salvador Santino Regilme (born 1986) is a Dutch International Relations scholar and political scientist focusing on international human rights norms, global governance, democratization, United States foreign policy, and foreign aid. He is a tenured Associate Professor of International Relations based at the Institute of History within the Faculty of Humanities of Leiden University, the Netherlands. He served as the Program Chair of the MA International Relations at Leiden University from 2023 to 2026.

He is one of the world's leading International Relations scholar on human rights and global development, with his award-winning research on the impact of post-Cold War United States foreign aid on human rights and state repression in the Global South.

Previously, he worked as a Käte Hamburger Fellow on global cooperation based in Germany (funded by the German Federal Ministry of Education and Research), as a Fox International Fellow at the MacMillan Center for Area and International Studies at Yale University, and he briefly held a tenure-track position as Assistant Professor of International Relations within the Department of Political Science at Northern Illinois University, USA. He was also a visiting researcher at the Comparative Constitutionalism Group of the Max Planck Institute for the Study of Religious and Ethnic Diversity in Göttingen, Germany Regilme won the 2022 Individual Fellowship from the Netherlands Institute for Advanced Study in Amsterdam.

== Education ==
Graduating from De La Salle University in Manila, Philippines with a B.A. in philosophy (minor in development studies and political science), magna cum laude, he received in 2011 his M.A. in Democratic Governance and Civil Society from the Universität Osnabrück and a Joint PhD in Political Science and North American Studies in 2015 from the Freie Universität Berlin, with joint supervision at Yale University He studied Political Science and International Relations on a Fox Fellowship at Yale University, and he completed a Postdoctoral Fellowship at the Center for Global Cooperation Research at the Universität Duisburg-Essen.

He completed his secondary school education as a scholar of Franciscan Capuchins at Lourdes School, Quezon City. He is the first Philippines-born scholar to complete a joint PhD in Political Science and American Studies and the first Philippines-born scholarship recipient of the prestigious "Helmut-Schmidt Program" (formerly Public Policy and Good Governance), which allowed him to earn a German-language diploma from the Goethe-Institut Göttingen and a MA from the Universität Osnabrück.

Regilme completed his PhD under the supervision of Lora Anne Viola (chair), Thomas Risse, and Susan D. Hyde through a joint supervision from Freie Universität Berlin and Yale University, funded by the German Research Foundation's Excellence Initiative and the Fox International Fellowship at Yale University.

== Publications ==
He is the author of Aid Imperium: United States Foreign Policy and Human Rights in Post-Cold War Southeast Asia, published by the University of Michigan Press, 2021, co-editor of the volume Human Rights at Risk: International Institutions, American Power, and the Future of Dignity (Rutgers University Press), co-editor of American Hegemony and the Rise of Emerging Powers (Routledge, 2017) and the author of many peer-reviewed articles in leading journals such as Political Geography, International Studies Perspectives, Third World Quarterly, Geoforum, International Political Science Review, and Human Rights Review, among many others.

== Awards ==
Regilme's book Aid Imperium is the recipient of the 2023 Cecil B. Currey Book Award from the Association of Global South Studies and the 2023-2024 Best Book in Human Rights - Honorable Mention from the International Studies Association. Regilme is the 2019 Inaugural Winner of the Best Conference Paper Award for the Asia-Pacific of the International Studies Association, for his paper on the international human rights regime and the Trump administration. In 2022, he received Honorable Mention for the Best Scholarly Article Award in Human Rights from American Sociological Association for his paper on the global war on drugs in Colombia and the Philippines. He is the first non-German Fox International Fellow from the Freie Universität Berlin to Yale University. He is the recipient of several fellowships and grants from the German Federal and State Governments, German Academic Exchange Service, Yale University, De La Salle University-Manila, and Leiden University. In 2012, Regilme was named as one of the 100 Leaders of Tomorrow at the 42nd St. Gallen Symposium, held at the University of St. Gallen in Switzerland.

== Media ==
Regilme has appeared in several international media outlets, including Deutsche Welle, CNN and TRT World.

== Bibliography ==
Scholarly works (partial list)

Books

1. Regilme, Salvador Santino & Obert Hodzi. (2026). United States and Chinese foreign assistance and diplomacy: Aid for dominance. Manchester: Manchester University Press.
2. Regilme, Salvador Santino (ed.) (2024). Children's rights in crisis: multidisciplinary, transnational, and comparative perspectives. Manchester: Manchester University Press.
3. Regilme, Salvador Santino F. Jr. (ed.) (2023). The United States and China in the Era of Global Transformations: Geographies of Rivalry. Bristol: Bristol University Press.
4. Regilme, Salvador Santino F. Jr. & Irene Hadiprayitno. (Eds.) (2022). Human Rights at Risk: Global Governance, American Power, and the Future of Dignity. New Brunswick: Rutgers University Press.
5. Regilme, Salvador Santino F. Jr. (2021) Aid Imperium: United States Foreign Policy and Human Rights in Post-Cold War Southeast Asia. Ann Arbor: The University of Michigan Press.
6. Regilme, Salvador Santino F. Jr. and James Parisot (ed.) (2017hb; 2019pb) American Hegemony and the Rise of Emerging Powers: Cooperation or Conflict. Global Cooperation Series. London and New York: Routledge

Peer-Reviewed Articles

1. Regilme, Salvador Santino F. Jr. (2023). Crisis politics of dehumanisation during COVID-19: A framework for mapping the social processes through which dehumanisation undermines human dignity. The British Journal of Politics and International Relations, 25(3), 555-573.
2. Regilme, Salvador Santino F. Jr. (2023). State Violence in Narcotic Drug Governance: A Call for Harm Reduction and Human Rights Protection. Journal of Perpetrator Research. 5(1), pp. 65–76.
3. Regilme, Salvador Santino F. Jr. (2023). Systemic Hypocrisy in United States Foreign Policy. Social Change, 53(3), 391-398
4. Regilme, Salvador Santino F. Jr. (2022), United States foreign aid and multilateralism under the Trump presidency, New Global Studies.
5. De Groot, Tom and Salvador Santino F. Regilme Jr. (2021). Private Military and Security Companies and the Militarization of Humanitarianism. Journal of Developing Societies.
6. Regilme, Salvador Santino F. Jr. (2021). Contested Spaces of Authoritarian and Illiberal Politics: Human Rights and Democracy in Crisis. Political Geography.
7. Regilme, Salvador Santino F. Jr. & Spoldi, Elisabetta. (2021). Children in Armed Conflict: A Human Rights Crisis in Somalia. Global Jurist.
8. Regilme, Salvador Santino F. Jr. & Hodzi, Obert. (2021). Comparing American and Chinese Foreign Aid in the Era of Rising Powers. The International Spectator.
9. Regilme, Salvador Santino F. Jr. (2020). Visions of Peace Amidst a Human Rights Crisis: War on Drugs in Colombia and the Philippines. Journal of Global Security Studies.
10. Masters, Mercedes & Regilme, Salvador Santino F. Jr. (2020). Human Rights and British Citizenship: The Case of Shamima Begum as Citizen to Homo Sacer. Journal of Human Rights Practice.
11. Regilme, Salvador Santino F. Jr. (forthcoming in 2021). Competing Visions of Peace in the Age of Declining Democratization. Peace Review: A Journal of Social Justice.
12. Regilme, Salvador Santino F. Jr. (2019). Constitutional Order in Oligarchic Democracies: Neoliberal Rights versus Socio-Economic Rights. Law, Culture and the Humanities. 1-18
13. Regilme, Salvador Santino F. Jr. (2019). The Decline of American Power and Donald Trump: Reflections on Human Rights, Neoliberalism, and the World Order. Geoforum June 2019: 157–166.
14. Regilme, Salvador Santino F. Jr. (2018). Beyond Paradigms: Understanding the South China Sea Dispute Using Analytic Eclecticism. International Studies. (55)3:1-25
15. Regilme, Salvador Santino F. Jr. (2018). A Human Rights Tragedy: Strategic Localization of US Foreign Policy in Colombia. International Relations. (32)3: 343-365
16. Regilme, Salvador Santino F. Jr. (2018). The Global Politics of Human Rights: From Human Rights to Human Dignity?. International Political Science Review.
17. Regilme, Salvador Santino F. Jr. (2018) Mutual Delegitimization: American and Chinese Development Aid in the African Continent".The SAIS Review of International Affairs (Web article). (with Henrik Hartmann)
18. Regilme, Salvador Santino F. Jr. (2018) Does US Foreign Aid Undermine Human Rights? The 'Thaksinification' of the War on Terror Discourses and the Human Rights Crisis in Thailand, 2001 to 2006. Human Rights Review (19)1-73-95.
19. Regilme, Salvador Santino F. Jr. (2017) Genocide and Transitional Justice. In Human Rights Review. (18)1: 111-116.
20. Regilme, Salvador Santino F. Jr. (2016). The Philippines 2014-2015: Domestic Politics and Foreign Relations, A Critical Review. Asia Maior. XXVI/2015: 133-155. (with Carmina Y. Untalan)
21. Regilme, Salvador Santino F. Jr. (2016). Why Asia's Oldest Democracy Is Bound to Fail. Journal of Developing Societies. (32)3: 1-26
22. Regilme, Salvador Santino F. Jr. (2016). Habermasian Thinking on Civil Society and the Public Sphere in the Age of Globalization. Perspectives on Political Science. 1-7 (online version)
23. Regilme, Salvador Santino F. Jr. (2014). The Social Science of Human Rights: The Need for a "Second-Image Reversed". Third World Quarterly 35(8): 1390-1405.
24. Regilme, Salvador Santino F. Jr. (2014). Bringing the Global Political Economy Back In: Neoliberalism, Globalization, and Democratic Consolidation. International Studies Perspectives 15(3): 277-296 (download here)
25. Regilme, Salvador Santino F. Jr. (2013). Is International Labour Migration Good for Democratic Consolidation in the Global South? In Peace Review: A Journal of Social Justice 25(1): 97-103
26. Regilme, Salvador Santino F. Jr. (2013). Social Discipline, Democracy, and Modernity: Are They All Uniquely 'European'?. In Hamburg Review of Social Sciences 6 & 3 (7 & 1): 94-117
27. Regilme, Salvador Santino F. Jr. (2011) The Chimera of Europe's Normative Power in East Asia: A Constructivist Analysis. In Central European Journal of International and Security Studies 5 (1): 69-90

Book Chapters

1. Regilme, Salvador Santino F. Jr. (2022). The Global Human Rights Regime: Risks and Contestations. In Regilme, Salvador Santino F. Jr. and Irene Hadiprayitno. Human Rights at Risk: Global Governance, American Power, and the Future of Dignity. New Brunswick and London: Rutgers University Press.
2. Regilme, Salvador Santino F. Jr. (2022). Human Rights at Risk in the Era of Trump and American Decline. In Regilme, Salvador Santino F. Jr. and Irene Hadiprayitno. Human Rights at Risk: Global Governance, American Power, and the Future of Dignity. New Brunswick and London: Rutgers University Press.
3. Regilme, Salvador Santino F. Jr. (2020) Human rights and humanitarian actions on the international arena. In Badie, Bertrand; Berg-Schlosser, Dirk; Morlino, Leonardo. Handbook of Political Science – A Global Perspective. London: SAGE.
4. Regilme, Salvador Santino F. Jr. (2020). with James Parisot. (Chapter 13) Contested American Dominance: Global Order in an Era of Rising Powers. In S. A. Hamed Hosseini, Barry K. Gills, James Goodman, Sara Motta (eds.) The Routledge Handbook of Transformative Global Studies. New York: Routledge.
5. Regilme, Salvador Santino F. Jr. (2018). Introduction: Debating American Hegemony: Global Cooperation and Conflict. In Regilme S.S., Parisot J. (Eds). American Hegemony and the Rise of Emerging Powers. London and New York: Routledge . 3–18.
6. Regilme, Salvador Santino F. Jr. (2018). Conclusion: The Future of Global Cooperation and Conflict. In Regilme S.S., Parisot J. (Eds). American Hegemony and the Rise of Emerging Powers. London and New York: Routledge. 216–219.
7. Regilme, Salvador Santino F. Jr. (2016). Global Migration as a Human Rights Issue: Prospects for Global Cooperation or Conflict? In Böckenförde, Markus, Nadja Krupke, and Philipp Michaelis (eds). A Multidisciplinary Mosaic: Reflections on Global Cooperation and Migration (Global Dialogues 13). Duisburg: Käte Hamburger Kolleg/Centre for Global Cooperation Research (KHK/GCR21).
8. Regilme, Salvador Santino F. Jr. (2013). It Takes Two to Tango: A Constructivist Analysis of EU-ASEAN Interregional Relations. In The EU: A Global Power in the Making – Europe's Present and Future Role in a Changing World. Volume 2. Edited by Astrid B. Boening, Jan-Frederik Kremer and Aukje van Loon. Springer Publishing (Part of the Global Power Shift Series)

Encyclopedia and General Reference Articles

1. (2019). Regilme, Salvador Santino F. Jr. & Henrik Hartmann. "Global Shift". The Palgrave Encyclopedia of Global Security Studies DOI:
2. (2019). Regilme, Salvador Santino F. Jr. & Elif Polat. "Right to Economic Dignity". The Palgrave Encyclopedia of Global Security Studies DOI:
3. (2019). Regilme, Salvador Santino F. Jr. & Beate Beller. "Security State". The Palgrave Encyclopedia of Global Security Studies
4. (2016) Regilme, Salvador Santino F. Jr. "Human Rights Violations and Protection". In The SAGE Encyclopedia of War: Social Science Perspectives. Thousand Oaks; London; New Delhi: Sage Publications.
