= Disinflation =

Economic term

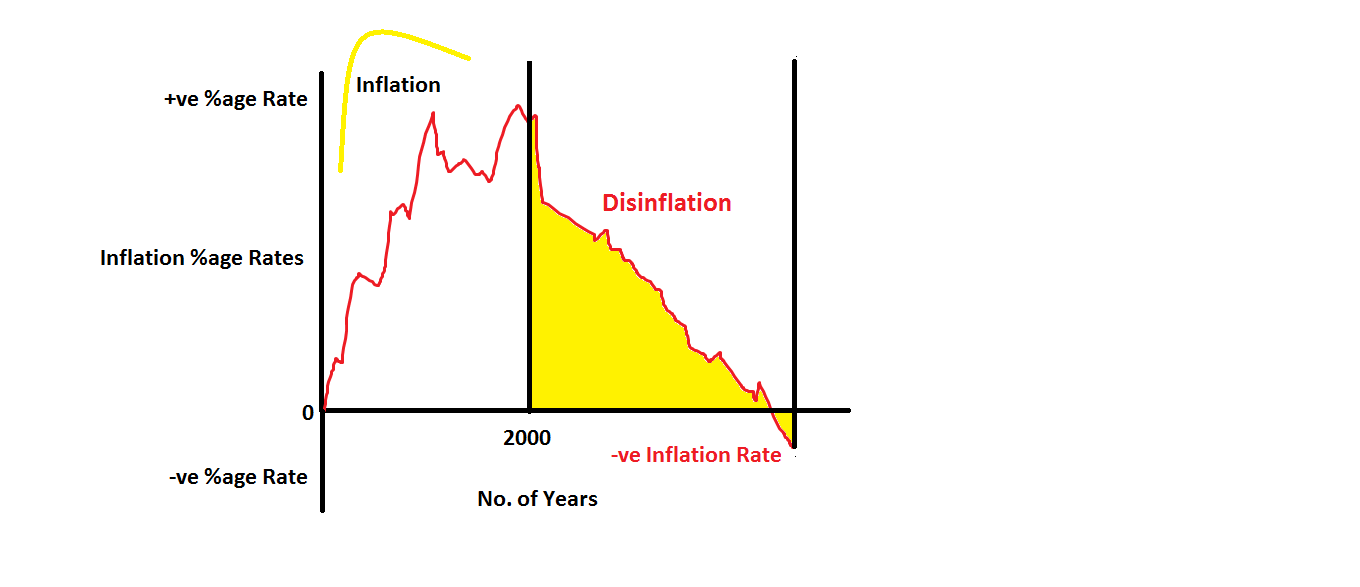

Disinflation is a decrease in the rate of inflation – a slowdown in the relative rate of increase of the general price level of goods and services in a nation's gross domestic product over time. It is the opposite of reflation.

If the inflation rate is not very high to start with, disinflation can lead to deflation – decreases in the general price level of goods and services. For example if the annual inflation rate one month is 5% and it is 4% the following month, prices disinflated by 1% but are still increasing at a 4% annual rate. If the current rate is 1% and it is -2% the following month, prices disinflated by 3% and are decreasing at a 2% annual rate.

== See also ==
- Hyperinflation
- Stagflation
- Devaluation
- Chronic inflation
- Deflation
