= Elder Index =

The Elder Index is a measure of the cost of living for older adults in the United States. It is calculated for every county in the United States, and provides a realistic benchmark of living expenditure that includes housing, food, transportation, health care, and basic household items for older adults. The Elder Index is produced by the Gerontology Institute, within the John W. McCormack Graduate School of Policy and Global Studies at the University of Massachusetts Boston.

== History ==
The Elder Index was conceived of by Ellen Bruce and Laura Henze Russell at the Gerontology Institute, UMass Boston. The strategy used in calculating the Elder Index draws on a “family-budget” approach, taking into account the characteristics and spending patterns of elder households. Starting in 2011, the Elder Index has been calculated and distributed for every county in the United States.

== Key features ==
Some key features of the Elder Index include:

- Income adequacy. The Elder Index is a realistic measure of income adequacy as opposed to various commonly used poverty measures that reflect income inadequacy.
- Geographic specificity. The Elder Index values illustrate geographical differences in cost of living across counties, states, regions, and the entire country.
- Difference in health. Healthcare expenditures differ across individuals with different health statuses. The Elder Index takes into account such differences and is calculated based on whether an older adult is in poor health, good health, or excellent health.
- Difference in housing tenure. As the cost of living differs substantially for homeowners and for renters, calculations for the Elder Index consider three housing scenarios: homeowners with outstanding mortgage, homeowners without mortgage, and renters.
- Independent living. The Elder Index describes how much it costs for an older one-person or two-person household to live at a modest level and remain independent without financial support from need-based programs.

== Summary of the 2016 Elder Index ==
- At the national level in 2016, for older adults living in their own homes without a mortgage, the Elder Index is $20,064 per year for an older adult living alone, and $30,576 for an older couple living together, assuming good health.
- The Index is higher for renters ($23,364 for singles and $33,876 for couples) and for those who are paying off a mortgage ($30,972 for singles and $41,484 for couples), assuming good health.
- Geographically, large shares of the Northeast, West, Alaska and Hawaii have cost of living between $21,396 and $33,276 for a single renter in good health, among the highest nationwide.
- Estimates from the 2016 Elder Index also suggest that half of older adults living alone, and one out of four older adults living in two-elder households, lack the financial resources required to pay for basic needs in the United States.

== Comparison with other measures ==
The Elder Index is different from conventional poverty measures in that it is built around everyday expenses encountered by older adults and is a realistic benchmark of income adequacy. For example, in 2016, the share of older adults living alone with incomes below the Federal Poverty Line is 18.8% on average throughout the United States; another 34.2% live above the poverty level yet still have income less than what is required to live with economic security.
