= Differential accumulation =

Differential accumulation is an approach for analysing capitalist development and crisis, tying together mergers and acquisitions, stagflation and globalization as integral facets of accumulation. The concept has been developed by Jonathan Nitzan and Shimshon Bichler in their Capital as Power.

The concept of differential accumulation emphasizes the powerful drive by dominant capital groups to beat the average and exceed the normal rate of return. This concept is tied to a definition of capital as a social category rather than a material category (as seen by neoclassical thinkers). "Capitalism is not an ‘economic system’, but a whole social order, and its principal category of capital must therefore have an ‘encompassing’ definition."

...capitalization is a forward-looking process. What is being accumulated are claims on the future flow of profit. The pace of accumulation therefore depends on two factors: (a) the institutional arrangements affecting profit expectations; and (b) the normal rate of return used to discount them into their present value. The effect of rising industrial capacity on these factors is not only highly complex and possibly non-linear, but its direction can be positive as well as negative. But then if capital is not ‘tangible’, how should its accumulation be measured? Surely, the mere augmentation of money values tells us little about power, particularly in the presence of inflation or deflation. The answer is rooted in the relative nature of power. The power of the absentee owner is the power to control part of the social process, and that becomes meaningful primarily against the power of other owners.

== Regimes of accumulation ==
A firm can raise its profit through "breadth" by adding more employees to the organization. Conversely the firm can pursue "depth" by generating higher profit per employee. Each avenue of breadth and depth can be divided into pursuing differential accumulation through "internal" or "external" means. This gives us four categories of differential accumulation: internal breadth by amalgamation (buy or join other businesses), external breadth through greenfield investment (build new factories), internal depth via cost-cutting (make workers work harder or find ways to reduce the price of inputs), and external depth through stagflation (raise prices faster than the competition).

	External	Internal
Breadth	Green-field	Mergers & Acquisitions
Depth	Stagflation	Cost-cutting

=== Dynamics of the regimes ===
Nitzan and Bichler make several broad conclusions.

1. Of the four regimes, the most important are amalgamation and stagflation, which tend to oscillate inversely to each other.
2. Over the longer haul, amalgamation grows exponentially relative to green-field investment, contributing to the stagnation tendency of modern capitalism.
3. The wave-like pattern of mergers and acquisitions reflects the progressive break-up of socioeconomic ‘envelopes’, as dominant capital moves through successive amalgamation at the industry, sectoral, national, and, finally, global level. In this sense, they argue that the current global merger wave is an integral facet of differential accumulation.
4. Periodic lulls in amalgamation tend to be compensated for by stagflation, which appears as a crisis at the societal level, but which contributes significantly to differential accumulation at the disaggregate level. An end to the present worldwide merger boom could therefore trigger global stagflation.
5. Stagflation crises have been previously 'resolved' when dominant capital broke its existing envelope, pushing to amalgamate within a broader universe of takeover targets. Given that there is nothing more to conquer beyond the global envelope, Nitzan and Bichler argue that future stagflation crises may prove much more difficult to tame.

== Stagflation in differential accumulation theory ==
Differential accumulation theory sees stagflation oscillate inversely with periods where mergers and acquisitions are dominant as a major strategy of dominant capital groups to "beat the market" or exceed the normal, average rate of return on investments. If too many people try to "beat the average" a market imbalance results. Stagflation, which appears as a crisis at the societal level, contributes significantly to differential accumulation at the disaggregate level, that is, of dominant capital groups accumulating faster than smaller businesses. Since the 20th century, the dominant capital group which has benefited from stagflation has been the "weapondollar-petrodollar coalition" during periods of Mid-east crises and rising oil prices. These periods have oscillated between periods of relative "peace" during which mergers and acquisitions have been the dominant strategy for beating the average.

=== Similarity to "supply shock" theories of stagflation ===
Differential accumulation theory shares some similarities with the "supply shock" theory where there are sudden price changes due to a reduction in supply. One effect of cumulative mergers and acquisitions is that can result in concentrating the power to limit supply among fewer entities.

The supply shock theory in political economy has focused mainly on the effect of OPEC (Organization of Petroleum Exporting Countries) on the price of oil through the restriction of supply. This is similar to differential accumulation's look at the "weapondollar-petrodollar coalition" and OPEC. The similarity ends where differential accumulation places the cause of the price of oil in the creation of a global feeling of crisis and perceived scarcity because of conflicts in the Middle East, and not, as supply shock theories hold, on an actual reduction in supply.

== Deflation and the crisis of accumulation ==
Differential accumulation provides an alternative view to the Great Depression of the 1930s and the 2008 financial crisis. Both of these crises are crises of deflation, and thus crises of accumulation. Businesses not only try to beat the average rate of accumulation, but struggle to avoid the threat of deflation. Deflation brings social destabilization and threatens capitalist accumulation.

The overall debt burden of 2008 increases the deflationary threat over that from the Great Depression. Nitzan and Bichler state that the 2002 ratio of total debt to GDP in the US reached 290% - compared with 165% on the eve of the Great Depression. If prices begin to fall, they argue, firms will be unable to service their debt, which creates a risk of debt deflation, chain bankruptcies, and the collapse of accumulation. "As the Great Depression unfolded falling nominal GDP caused the debt-to-GDP to soar to over 270%. a comparable drop now would push debt-to-GDP to over 400%".

Nitzan and Bichler argue that the Great Depression brought deflation, not inflation (at least from an aggregate viewpoint). Gardiner Means (1935) showed in his study of the US during this period: smaller firms with little market power saw falling prices and only a moderate drop in output. Large firms were able to keep their prices relatively stable, and even raise them in some cases, and let output fall by as much as 80%.

They stipulate that the primary cause of these crises is not financial but a crisis of differential accumulation. Inflation was helpful for not only providing differential accumulation but also to forestall the threat of deflation. Mergers had been in hibernation since early 2000s, which resulted in a greater reliance on the socially disruptive tool of inflation as stagflation. The soaring price of oil from 2004 to 2008 helped to sustain inflation, but with a looming threat of cheap manufactured goods from developing countries. Deflation in 2008 had become a looming threat.

Instead of focusing on the start of the 2008 financial crisis, Nitzan and Bichler focus on bear markets, the periods during which stocks (as measured in constant-dollars) were in a downward trend or where each successive peak is lower than the previous one. By their reckoning a protracted Bear market has existed since 1999, which points to a much more entrenched accumulation crisis.

Nitzan and Bichler argue that there is nothing automatic about the shifts between bear and bull markets. Each crisis has had a different solution. They identify a number of bear markets in the last century and the unpredictable solutions that shifted capitalism back to bull markets:

- The crisis of 1905–1920 was resolved with a shift from robber-baron capitalism to large-scale business enterprise.
- The crisis of 1928–1948 saw the rise of the Keynesian welfare-warfare state and large government. "Unregulated" capitalism ended.
- The crisis of 1968–1981 saw neoliberal globalization, increasingly worldwide capital flows and the closing down of the Keynesian state.
