= Shimshon Bichler =

Israeli economist

Academic background
- Influences: Thorstein Veblen, Karl Marx, Michał Kalecki, Cornelius Castoriadis, Lewis Mumford

Academic work
- Discipline: Political economy
- School or tradition: Institutional economics
- Notable ideas: Power theory of value, differential accumulation

Shimshon Bichler (Hebrew: שמשון ביכלר) is an Israeli educator who teaches political economy at colleges and universities in Israel. Along with Jonathan Nitzan, Bichler has created a power theory of capitalism and theory of differential accumulation in their analysis of the political economy of wars, Israel, and globalization.

== Work ==
Nitzan and Bichler share an intellectual legacy with institutional political economists such as Thorstein Veblen. In particular, they share Veblen's explanation that business exists with the end of pecuniary (monetary) gain and not the accumulation of goods of consumption or of physical machines.

According to their power theory of value (introduced in their Capital as Power: A Study of Order and Creorder, published 2009), in capitalism, power is the governing principle as rooted in the centrality of private ownership. Private ownership is wholly and only an act of institutionalized exclusion, and institutionalized exclusion is a matter of organized power.

== Major works ==
- Nitzan, Jonathan and Shimshon Bichler – Global Political Economy of Israel – 2002
- Nitzan, Jonathan and Shimshon Bichler – Capital as Power: A Study of Order and Creorder – 2009
