= Jonathan Nitzan =

Israeli-Canadian economist

Academic background
- Influences: Thorstein Veblen, Karl Marx, Michał Kalecki, Cornelius Castoriadis, Lewis Mumford

Academic work
- Discipline: Political economy
- School or tradition: Institutional economics
- Notable ideas: Power theory of value, differential accumulation
- Website: Information at IDEAS / RePEc

Jonathan Nitzan is an Israeli-Canadian economist who is Professor of Political Economy at York University, Toronto, Canada.

== Work ==
Nitzan is the co-author (with Shimshon Bichler) of Capital as Power: A Study of Order and Creorder, published 2009. Their writings focus of the nature of capital in capitalism and provide an alternative view to that of Marxian and neoclassical economics. In their theory, capital is the quantification of power. According to their power theory of value, in capitalism, power is the governing principle as rooted in the centrality of private ownership. Private ownership is wholly and only an act of institutionalized exclusion, and institutionalized exclusion is a matter of organized power. Central to this theory is the concept of differential accumulation where firms strive to profit more by beating the average profit level.

Nitzan and Bichler share an intellectual legacy with institutional political economists such as Thorstein Veblen. In particular, they share Veblen's explanation that business exists with the end of pecuniary (monetary) gain and not the accumulation of goods of consumption or of physical machines.

== Major works ==
- Nitzan, Jonathan and Shimshon Bichler – Global Political Economy of Israel – 2002
- Nitzan, Jonathan and Shimshon Bichler – Capital as Power: A Study of Order and Creorder – 2009
