= Demand-pull inflation =

Type of inflation where aggregate demand increases faster than aggregate supply

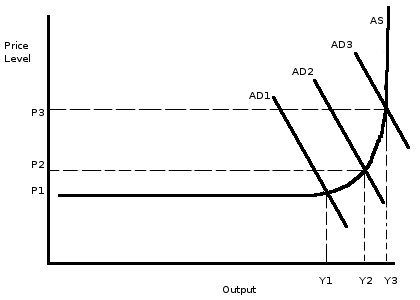
Aggregate demand increasing faster than production

Demand-pull inflation occurs when aggregate demand in an economy is more than aggregate supply. It involves inflation rising as real gross domestic product rises and unemployment falls, as the economy moves along the Phillips curve. This is commonly described as "too much money chasing too few goods". More accurately, it should be described as involving "too much money spent chasing too few goods", since only money that is spent on goods and services can cause inflation. This would not be expected to happen, unless the economy is already at a full employment level. It is the opposite of cost-push inflation.

== How it occurs ==
In Keynesian theory, increased employment results in increased aggregate demand (AD), which leads to further hiring by firms to increase output. Due to capacity constraints, this increase in output will eventually become so small that the price of the good will rise. At first, unemployment will go down, shifting AD1 to AD2, which increases demand (noted as "Y") by (Y2 − Y1). This increase in demand means more workers are needed, and then AD will be shifted from AD2 to AD3, but this time much less is produced than in the previous shift, but the price level has risen from P2 to P3, a much higher increase in price than in the previous shift. This increase in price is what causes inflation in an overheating economy.

Demand-pull inflation is in contrast with cost-push inflation, when price and wage increases are being transmitted from one sector to another. However, these can be considered as different aspects of an overall inflationary process—demand-pull inflation explains how price inflation starts, and cost-push inflation demonstrates why inflation once begun is so difficult to stop.

== Causes of demand-pull inflation ==
- There is a quick increase in consumption and investment along with extremely confident firms.
- There is a sudden increase in exports due to huge under-valuation of the currency.
- There is a lot of government spending.
- The expectation that inflation will rise often leads to a rise in inflation. Workers and firms will increase their prices to 'catch up' to inflation.
- There is excessive monetary growth, when there is too much money in the system chasing too few goods. The 'price' of a good will thus increase.
- There is a rise in population.

== See also ==
- Built-in inflation
- Cost-push inflation
- Demand shock
- Triangle model
- Demand-pull theory
