= Cost-push inflation =

Inflation driven by a rise in the cost of goods and services

Aggregate supply – aggregate demand model illustration of aggregate supply (AS) shifting to AS' and causing price level to increase while output shrinks

Cost-push inflation is a purported type of inflation caused by increases in the cost of important goods or services where no suitable alternative is available.

== Cause ==
As businesses face higher prices for underlying inputs, they are forced to increase prices of their outputs. It is contrasted with the theory of demand-pull inflation. Both accounts of inflation have at various times been put forward, with inconclusive evidence as to which explanation is superior. Cost-push inflation can also result from a rise in expected inflation, which in turn the workers will demand higher wages, thus causing inflation.

== Examples ==
One example of cost-push inflation is the oil crisis of the 1970s, which some economists see as a major cause of the inflation experienced in the Western world in that decade. It is argued that this inflation resulted from increases in the cost of petroleum imposed by the member states of OPEC. Since petroleum is so important to industrialized economies, a large increase in its price can lead to the increase in the price of most products, raising the price level. Some economists argue that such a change in the price level can raise the inflation rate over longer periods, due to adaptive expectations and the price/wage spiral, so that a supply shock can have persistent effects.

== Debated existence and opposition to the concept ==
The existence of cost-push inflation is disputed. Dallas S. Batten described it as a myth, writing "Though the cost-push argument is appealing on the surface, neither economic theory nor empirical evidence indicates that businesses and labor can cause continually rising prices", and identifying the real cause as "increased aggregate demand resulting from increased money growth".

Milton Friedman criticised the concept of cost-push inflation, writing "To each businessman separately it looks as if he has to raise prices because costs have gone up. But then, we must ask, 'Why did his costs go up? ... The answer is, because ... total demand all over was increasing." Friedman wrote, "the inflation arises from one and only one reason: an increase in a quantity of money."

== See also ==
- Stagflation
- Demand-pull inflation
- Triangle model
